

Deaths in December

 4: Sócrates

Current sporting seasons

American football 2011

National Football League
NCAA Division I FBS
NCAA Division I FCS

Auto racing 2011

V8 Supercar

Basketball 2011–2012

NBA
NCAA Division I men
NCAA Division I women
Euroleague
EuroLeague Women
Eurocup
EuroChallenge
Australia
France
Germany
Greece
Israel
Italy
Philippines
Philippine Cup
Russia
Spain
Turkey

Cricket 2011–2012

Australia:
Sheffield Shield
Ryobi One-Day Cup

Football (soccer) 2011–2012

National teams competitions
2014 FIFA World Cup qualification
UEFA Women's Euro 2013 qualifying
International clubs competitions
UEFA (Europe) Champions League
UEFA Europa League
UEFA Women's Champions League
Copa Sudamericana
CAF Confederation Cup
CONCACAF (North & Central America) Champions League
OFC (Oceania) Champions League
Domestic (national) competitions
Argentina
Australia
Brazil
England
France
Germany
Iran
Italy
Japan
Portugal
Russia
Scotland
Spain

Golf 2011

European Tour

Ice hockey 2011–2012

National Hockey League
Kontinental Hockey League
Czech Extraliga
Elitserien
Canadian Hockey League:
OHL, QMJHL, WHL
NCAA Division I men
NCAA Division I women

Rugby union 2011–2012

Heineken Cup
Amlin Challenge Cup
Aviva Premiership
RaboDirect Pro12
LV= Cup
Top 14
Sevens World Series

Snooker 2011–2012

Players Tour Championship

Volleyball 2011–2012

International clubs competitions
Men's CEV Champions League
Women's CEV Champions League

Winter sports

Alpine Skiing World Cup
Biathlon World Cup
Bobsleigh World Cup
Cross-Country Skiing World Cup
ISU Grand Prix
ISU Junior Grand Prix
Freestyle Skiing World Cup
Luge World Cup
Nordic Combined World Cup
Short Track Speed Skating World Cup
Skeleton World Cup
Ski Jumping World Cup
Snowboard World Cup
Speed Skating World Cup

Days of the month

December 31, 2011 (Saturday)

Cross-country skiing
Tour de Ski:
Stage 3 in Oberstdorf, Germany:
Men's sprint classic (all RUS):  Nikita Kriukov 2:28.6  Alexey Petukhov +0.7  Nikolay Morilov +1.2 
Women's sprint classic:  Justyna Kowalczyk  2:45.3   Marit Bjørgen  +3.2  Astrid Uhrenholdt Jacobsen  +6.3

Ice hockey
World Junior Championship in Canada; matchday 6 (teams in bold advance to the semifinals, teams in italics advance to the quarterfinals): 
Group A in Calgary:
 6–4 
 3–4 (OT) 
Final standings: Sweden, Russia 10 points, Slovakia 6, Switzerland 4, Latvia 0.
Group B in Edmonton:
 0–4 
 3–2 
Final standings: Canada 12 points, Finland 9, Czech Republic 6, United States 3, Denmark 0.
World Women's U18 Championship in Czech Republic; matchday 1: 
Group A in Zlín:
 1–4 
 8–0 
Group B in Přerov:
 13–1 
 3–0

December 30, 2011 (Friday)

Cross-country skiing
Tour de Ski:
Stage 2 in Oberhof, Germany:
Men's 15 km classic handicap start:  Axel Teichmann  46:03.3  Petter Northug  46:05.6  Dario Cologna  46:06.2 
Women's 10 km classic handicap start:  Justyna Kowalczyk  32:02.4  Therese Johaug  32:02.6  Marit Bjørgen  32:11.5

Darts
PDC World Championship in London, England, quarter-finals: 
Andy Hamilton  5–2 Kim Huybrechts 
John Part  4–5 James Wade 
Simon Whitlock  5–1 Gary Anderson 
Adrian Lewis  5–3 Terry Jenkins

Equestrianism
Show jumping – World Cup, Western European League:
8th competition in Mechelen, Belgium:  Gregory Wathelet  on Copin van de Broy  Kevin Staut  on Silvana  Rik Hemeryck  on Quarco de Kerambars

Ice hockey
World Junior Championship in Canada; matchday 5: 
Group A in Calgary:
 9–1 
 5–3 
Group B in Edmonton:
 2–5 
 10–1

Mixed martial arts
UFC 141 in Las Vegas, United States:
Featherweight bout: Jimy Hettes  def. Nam Phan  via unanimous decision (30–25, 30–25, 30–26)
Light Heavyweight bout: Alexander Gustafsson  def. Vladimir Matyushenko  via TKO (punches)
Welterweight bout: Johny Hendricks  def. Jon Fitch  via KO (punch)
Lightweight bout: Nate Diaz  def. Donald Cerrone  via unanimous decision (30–27, 30–27, 29–28)
Heavyweight bout: Alistair Overeem  def. Brock Lesnar  via TKO (strikes)

Ski jumping
Four Hills Tournament:
Stage 1 in Oberstdorf, Germany:
HS 137 (all AUT):  Gregor Schlierenzauer 283.3 points  Andreas Kofler 265.2  Thomas Morgenstern 264.3

December 29, 2011 (Thursday)

Alpine skiing
Men's World Cup in Bormio, Italy:
Downhill:  Didier Défago  2:01.81  Patrick Küng  2:02.10  Klaus Kröll  2:02.23 
Women's World Cup in Lienz, Austria:
Slalom:  Marlies Schild  1:51.42  Tina Maze  1:52.21  Mikaela Shiffrin  1:52.72

Cricket
India in Australia:
1st Test in Melbourne, day 4:  333 & 240;  282 & 169. Australia win by 122 runs; lead 4-match series 1–0. 
Sri Lanka in South Africa:
2nd Test in Durban, day 4:  338  & 279;  168  & 241. Sri Lanka win by 208 runs; 3-match series tied 1–1.

Cross-country skiing
Tour de Ski:
Stage 1 in Oberhof, Germany:
Men's 3.75 km free prologue:  Petter Northug  7:58.3  Dario Cologna  7:59.0  Maurice Manificat  8:02.3
Women's 2.5 km free prologue:  Justyna Kowalczyk  7:03.7  Marit Bjørgen  7:04.1  Hanna Brodin  7:07.7

Darts
PDC World Championship in London, England, third round:
John Part  4–2 Kevin Painter 
James Wade  4–0 Steve Farmer 
Kim Huybrechts  4–1 Paul Nicholson 
Simon Whitlock  4–3 Michael van Gerwen 
Dave Chisnall  0–4 Andy Hamilton 
Gary Anderson  4–1 Colin Lloyd

Football (soccer)
 Chilean Primera División Campeonato Clausura Final, second leg (first leg score in parentheses): Universidad de Chile 3–0 (0–0) Cobreloa. Universidad de Chile win 4–1 on points.
Universidad de Chile win their 15th league title.

Ice hockey
World Junior Championship in Canada; matchday 4:
Group A in Calgary:  0–14  
Group B in Edmonton:  2–10

December 28, 2011 (Wednesday)

Alpine skiing
Women's World Cup in Lienz, Austria:
Giant slalom:  Anna Fenninger  2:16.08 (1:06.85, 1:09.23)  Federica Brignone  2:16.28 (1:06.78, 1:09.50)  Tessa Worley  2:16.47 (1:07.26, 1:09.21)

Darts
PDC World Championship in London, England (ENG unless stated):
Second round:
Mervyn King 1–4 Michael van Gerwen 
Simon Whitlock  4–1 Steve Beaton
Colin Lloyd 4–1 Scott Rand
Gary Anderson  4–2 Devon Petersen 
Third round:
Adrian Lewis 4–0 Wayne Jones
Justin Pipe 1–4 Terry Jenkins

Ice hockey
World Junior Championship in Canada; matchday 3:
Group A in Calgary:
 4–3 (GWS) 
 3–1 
Group B in Edmonton:
 1–4 
 5–0

December 27, 2011 (Tuesday)

Darts
PDC World Championship in London, England, second round:
Terry Jenkins  4–1 Co Stompé 
Richie Burnett  1–4 John Part 
Vincent van der Voort  3–4 Andy Hamilton 
James Richardson  1–4 Kim Huybrechts 
Phil Taylor  1–4 Dave Chisnall 
Paul Nicholson  4–0 Alan Tabern

Figure skating
Russian Championships in Saransk:
Pairs:  Vera Bazarova / Yuri Larionov 194.86 points  Ksenia Stolbova / Fedor Klimov 182.13  Anastasia Martiusheva / Alexei Rogonov 179.94
Bazarova & Larionov win their first national title.
Ladies:  Adelina Sotnikova 193.71 points  Yulia Lipnitskaya 191.65  Alena Leonova 178.15
Sotnikova wins her third national title.

Ice hockey
World Junior Championship in Canada, matchday 2:
Group A in Calgary:  3–1 
Group B in Edmonton:  7–0

December 26, 2011 (Monday)

American football
NFL Monday Night Football, Week 16: New Orleans Saints 45, Atlanta Falcons 16
With 307 passing yards in the game, Saints quarterback Drew Brees breaks Dan Marino's single-season record from the  season, of 5,084 yards.

Cricket
Sri Lanka in South Africa, 2nd Test in Durban:
Sri Lanka's Mahela Jayawardene becomes the ninth player in history to score 10,000 runs in Test cricket, and the fifth fastest to reach that milestone.

Figure skating
Russian Championships in Saransk:
Men:  Evgeni Plushenko 259.67 points  Artur Gachinski 249.58  Sergei Voronov 240.79
Plushenko wins the title for the ninth time.
Ice dancing:  Ekaterina Bobrova / Dmitri Soloviev 171.47 points  Elena Ilinykh / Nikita Katsalapov 161.94  Ekaterina Riazanova / Ilia Tkachenko 154.65
Bobrova & Soloviev win the title for the second time.

Football (soccer)
 Chilean Primera División Campeonato Clausura Final, first leg: Cobreloa 0–0 Universidad de Chile

Ice hockey
World Junior Championship in Canada; matchday 1:
Group A in Calgary:
 4–9 
 0–3 
Group B in Edmonton:
 1–8 
 3–11

December 25, 2011 (Sunday)

American football
NFL Christmas game, Week 16: Green Bay Packers 35, Chicago Bears 21
The Packers' victory ensures home-field advantage throughout the playoffs, and allows the Atlanta Falcons to claim an NFC Wild Card place at the expense of the Bears, who are eliminated.

Basketball
NBA season opening day:
New York Knicks 106, Boston Celtics 104
Miami Heat 105, Dallas Mavericks 94
Chicago Bulls 88, Los Angeles Lakers 87
Oklahoma City Thunder 97, Orlando Magic 89
Los Angeles Clippers 105, Golden State Warriors 86

December 24, 2011 (Saturday)

December 23, 2011 (Friday)

Darts
PDC World Championship in London, England, second round:
Mark Walsh  3–4 Kevin Painter 
James Wade  4–0 Jelle Klaasen 
Steve Farmer  4–2 Kevin Münch

December 22, 2011 (Thursday)

Basketball
Euroleague Regular Season Matchday 10 (teams in bold advance to the Top 16):
Group A:
Bennet Cantù  76–83  Fenerbahçe Ülker
Gescrap Bizkaia  77–72  Caja Laboral
SLUC Nancy  74–79  Olympiacos
Final standings: Fenerbahçe Ülker, Olympiacos 6–4, Bennet Cantù, Gescrap Bizkaia, Caja Laboral 5–5, SLUC Nancy 3–7.
Group C:
Anadolu Efes  66–75  Real Madrid
Spirou Charleroi  69–86  Maccabi Tel Aviv
Partizan Mt:s Belgrade  66–72  EA7 Emporio Armani
Final standings: Real Madrid 8–2, Maccabi Tel Aviv 7–3, Anadolu Efes 5–5, EA7 Emporio Armani, Partizan Mt:s Belgrade 4–6, Spirou Charleroi 2–8.

Darts
PDC World Championship in London, England, second round:
Wayne Jones  4–0 Roland Scholten 
Adrian Lewis  4–2 Robert Thornton 
Wes Newton  3–4 Justin Pipe

Football (soccer)
 Liga de Fútbol Profesional Torneo Apertura Final, second leg (first leg score in parentheses): Universitario 1–1 (0–2) The Strongest. The Strongest win 4–1 on points.
The Strongest win their eighth league title.

Snowboarding
World Cup in Carezza, Italy:
Slalom men:  Benjamin Karl   Simon Schoch   Siegfried Grabner 
Parallel slalom standings (after 4 of 11 events) & Overall standings: (1) Karl 3250 points (2) Roland Fischnaller  2530 (3) Andreas Prommegger  2350
Slalom women:  Patrizia Kummer   Isabella Laböck   Anke Karstens 
Parallel slalom standings (after 4 of 11 events) & Overall standings: (1) Fränzi Mägert-Kohli  2460 points (2) Julia Dujmovits  2150 (3) Amelie Kober  1860

December 21, 2011 (Wednesday)

Alpine skiing
Men's World Cup in Flachau, Austria:
Slalom:  Ivica Kostelić  1:48.94 (55.11, 53.83)  André Myhrer  1:49.01 (55.46, 53.55)  Cristian Deville  1:49.03 (55.25, 53.78)
Slalom standings (after 3 of 11 races): (1) Kostelić 245 points (2) Deville 180 (3) Myhrer 170
Overall standings (after 12 of 45 races): (1) Marcel Hirscher  425 points (2) Aksel Lund Svindal  416 (3) Ted Ligety  385

Basketball
Euroleague Regular Season Matchday 10 (teams in bold advance to the Top 16):
Group B:
Žalgiris Kaunas  87–76  KK Zagreb
Panathinaikos  71–66  Brose Baskets
Unicaja  83–91  CSKA Moscow
Final standings: CSKA Moscow 10–0, Panathinaikos 7–3, Žalgiris Kaunas, Unicaja 4–6, Brose Baskets 3–7, KK Zagreb 2–8.
Group D:
Asseco Prokom Gdynia  53–79  Montepaschi Siena
Union Olimpija Ljubljana  63–76  UNICS Kazan
FC Barcelona Regal  79–50  Galatasaray Medical Park
Final standings: FC Barcelona Regal 9–1, Montepaschi Siena 8–2, UNICS Kazan 7–3, Galatasaray Medical Park 4–6, Asseco Prokom Gdynia, Union Olimpija Ljubljana 1–9.
FIBA Africa Clubs Champions Cup in Salé, Morocco:
3rd place game:  AS Salé  80–75  Petro Atlético
Final:  Étoile Sportive du Sahel  82–60   Primeiro de Agosto
Étoile Sportive du Sahel win the title for the first time.

Cricket
Pakistan in Bangladesh:
2nd Test in Mirpur, day 5:  338 & 234 (82.1 overs);  470 & 107/3 (20.5 overs). Pakistan win by 7 wickets; win 2-match series 2–0.

Darts
PDC World Championship in London, England:
Preliminary round: Devon Petersen  4–3 José Oliveira de Sousa 
First round:
Andy Smith  0–3 Scott Rand 
John Part  3–0 John Henderson 
Simon Whitlock  3–0 Dennis Smith 
Steve Brown  2–3 Petersen

Football (soccer)
 Categoría Primera A Torneo Finalización Final, second leg (first leg score in parentheses): Once Caldas 2–1 (2–3) Junior. 3–3 on points, 4–4 on aggregate; Junior win 4–2 on penalties.
Junior win their seventh league title.

Snowboarding
World Cup in Carezza, Italy:
Giant slalom men:  Roland Fischnaller   Benjamin Karl   Rok Flander 
Giant slalom standings (after 3 of 11 events) & Overall standings: (1) Karl 2250 points (2) Fischnaller 2240 (3) Andreas Prommegger  1900
Giant slalom women:  Caroline Calvé   Amelie Kober   Marion Kreiner 
Giant slalom standings (after 3 of 11 events) & Overall standings: (1) Fränzi Mägert-Kohli  2060 points (2) Kober 1660 (3) Julia Dujmovits  1650

December 20, 2011 (Tuesday)

Alpine skiing
Women's World Cup in Flachau, Austria:
Slalom:  Marlies Schild  1:51.53 (55.48, 56.05)  Maria Höfl-Riesch  1:51.99 (56.01, 55.98)  Tina Maze  1:52.35 (55.77, 56.58)
Slalom standings (after 3 of 10 races): (1) Schild 300 points (2) Kathrin Zettel  155 (3) Höfl-Riesch 140
Overall standings (after 9 of 40 races): (1) Lindsey Vonn  554 points (2) Schild 324 (3) Viktoria Rebensburg  286

Basketball
FIBA Africa Clubs Champions Cup in Salé, Morocco:
Semifinals:
AS Salé  78–81  Étoile Sportive du Sahel
Primeiro de Agosto  91–82  Petro Atlético

Cricket
Pakistan in Bangladesh:
2nd Test in Mirpur, day 4:  338 & 114/5 (35 overs);  470 (154.5 overs; Shakib Al Hasan 6/82). Bangladesh trail by 18 runs with 5 wickets remaining.
Shakib becomes the first Bangladesh player to score a hundred and take five wickets in an innings, in the same Test match.

Darts
PDC World Championship in London, England:
Preliminary round: Joe Cullen  4–2 Oliver Ferenc 
First round:
Colin Lloyd  3–1 Darin Young 
Colin Osborne  1–3 Michael van Gerwen 
Gary Anderson  3–2 Jyhan Artut 
Terry Jenkins  3–0 Cullen

Freestyle skiing
World Cup in Méribel, France:
Dual moguls men:  Mikaël Kingsbury  20 points  Anthony Benna  15  Sho Kashima  21
Moguls standings (after 2 of 13 events): (1) Kingsbury 200 points (2) Kashima & Benna 140
Overall standings: (1) Kingsbury 40 points (2) Egor Korotkov  32 (3) Benna & Kashima 28
Dual moguls women:  Hannah Kearney  21 points  Justine Dufour-Lapointe  14  Heather McPhie  18
Moguls standings (after 2 of 13 events): (1) Kearney 200 points (2) Eliza Outtrim  106 (3) Nikola Sudová  105
Overall standings: (1) Kearney & Kelsey Serwa  40 points (3) Sanna Lüdi  32

December 19, 2011 (Monday)

Alpine skiing
Men's World Cup in Alta Badia, Italy:
Slalom:  Marcel Hirscher  1:47.16 (53.50, 53.66)  Giuliano Razzoli  1:47.72 (53.95, 53.77)  Felix Neureuther  1:47.76 (54.04, 53.72)
Slalom standings (after 2 of 11 races): (1) Hirscher 160 points (2) Ivica Kostelić  145 (3) Cristian Deville  120
Overall standings (after 11 of 45 races): (1) Hirscher 425 points (2) Aksel Lund Svindal  416 (3) Ted Ligety  385

Basketball
FIBA Africa Clubs Champions Cup in Salé, Morocco:
Quarterfinals:
ASB Mazembe  57–85  Primeiro de Agosto
Petro Atlético  86–80  C.R.D. Libolo
C.R. Al Hoceima  51–88  AS Salé
Union Bank  69–113  Étoile Sportive du Sahel

Cricket
Pakistan in Bangladesh:
2nd Test in Mirpur, day 3:  338;  292/3 (96 overs; Taufeeq Umar 130). Pakistan trail by 46 runs with 7 wickets remaining in the 1st innings.

Darts
PDC World Championship in London, England:
Preliminary round: Per Laursen  3–4 Petri Korte 
First round:
Andy Hamilton  3–2 Antonio Alcinas 
Mervyn King  3–0 Geoff Kime 
Kevin Painter  3–1 Arron Monk 
James Wade  3–1 Korte

Snooker
Players Tour Championship – Event 11 in Sheffield, England (ENG unless stated):
Final: Martin Gould 3–4 Tom Ford
Ford wins his second professional title.
Order of Merit (after 11 of 12 events): (1) Judd Trump 30,400 (2) Ronnie O'Sullivan 29,600 (3) Neil Robertson  28,100

December 18, 2011 (Sunday)

Alpine skiing
Men's World Cup in Alta Badia, Italy (AUT unless stated):
Giant slalom:  Massimiliano Blardone  2:46.49 (1:29.07, 1:17.42)  Hannes Reichelt 2:46.84 (1:28.91, 1:17.93)  Philipp Schörghofer 2:47.06 (1:28.78, 1:18.28)
Giant slalom standings (after 4 of 9 races): (1) Ted Ligety  330 points (2) Marcel Hirscher 265 (3) Schörghofer 182
Overall standings (after 10 of 45 races): (1) Aksel Lund Svindal  416 points (2) Beat Feuz  360 (3) Ligety 359
Women's World Cup in Courchevel, France:
Slalom:  Marlies Schild 1:42.64 (52.28, 50.36)  Tanja Poutiainen  1:44.51 (53.08, 51.43)  Kathrin Zettel 1:44.83 (54.03, 50.80)
Slalom standings (after 2 of 10 races): (1) Schild 200 points (2) Poutiainen 130 (3) Zettel 105
Overall standings (after 8 of 40 races): (1) Lindsey Vonn  522 points (2) Viktoria Rebensburg  286 (3) Elisabeth Görgl 269

American football
NFL, Week 15:
Kansas City Chiefs 19, Green Bay Packers 14
The Packers suffer their first loss of the season, thus ending their bid to become the second team in NFL history with a perfect season, after the 1972 Miami Dolphins.
Indianapolis Colts 27, Tennessee Titans 13
The Colts win their first game of the season, and avoid becoming the second team in NFL history to have a winless 0–16 record.

Badminton
BWF Super Series:
Super Series Masters Finals in Liuzhou, China (CHN unless stated):
Women's Doubles: Wang Xiaoli/Yu Yang def. Ha Jung-eun/Kim Min-jung  21–8, 21–12
Mixed Doubles: Zhang Nan/Zhao Yunlei def. Xu Chen/Ma Jin 21–13, 21–15
Men's Doubles: Mathias Boe/Carsten Mogensen  def. Chai Biao / Guo Zhendong 25–23, 21–7
Women's Singles: Wang Yihan def. Saina Nehwal  18–21, 21–13, 21–13
Men's Singles: Lin Dan def. Chen Long 21–12, 21–16

Biathlon
World Cup 3 in Hochfilzen, Austria:
2×6+2×7.5 km Mixed Relay:   (Olga Vilukhina, Olga Zaitseva, Alexey Volkov, Anton Shipulin) 1:13:33.4 (0+5)   (Veronika Vítková, Gabriela Soukalová, Ondřej Moravec, Michal Šlesingr) 1:14:00.4 (0+3)   (Marie Dorin Habert, Sophie Boilley, Alexis Bœuf, Simon Fourcade) 1:14:11.9 (0+9)

Bobsleigh
World Cup in Winterberg, Germany:
4-men:   (Thomas Florschütz, Gino Gerhardi, Kevin Kuske, Thomas Blaschek) 1:50.52 (55.39, 55.13)   (Alexandr Zubkov, Filipp Yegorov, Dmitry Trunenkov, Nikolay Hrenkov) 1:50.54 (55.38, 55.16)   (Oskars Melbārdis, Helvijs Lusis, Arvis Vilkaste, Janis Strenga) 1:50.65 (55.39, 55.26)
Standings (after 3 of 8 races): (1) Florschütz 625 points (2) Zubkov 619 (3) Steven Holcomb  578

Cricket
Pakistan in Bangladesh:
2nd Test in Mirpur, day 2:  338 (107.2 overs; Shakib Al Hasan 144);  87/1 (27 overs). Pakistan trail by 251 runs with 9 wickets remaining in the 1st innings.

Cross-country skiing
World Cup in Rogla, Slovenia:
Men's sprint freestyle:  Dario Cologna  2:27.7  Nikolay Morilov  2:28.0  Anders Gløersen  2:29.0
Sprint standings (after 4 of 13 races): (1) Alexei Petukhov  237 points (2) Teodor Peterson  207 (3) Cologna 160
Overall standings (after 10 of 37 races): (1) Petter Northug  600 points (2) Cologna 508 (3) Maurice Manificat  266
Women's sprint freestyle:  Maiken Caspersen Falla  2:15.8  Chandra Crawford  2:16.2  Ida Ingemarsdotter  2:17.3
Sprint standings (after 4 of 13 races): (1) Kikkan Randall  280 points (2) Falla 216 (3) Natalya Matveyeva  212
Overall standings (after 10 of 37 races, all NOR): (1) Marit Bjørgen 582 points (2) Vibeke Skofterud 479 (3) Therese Johaug 471

Darts
PDC World Championship in London, England:
Preliminary round: Connie Finnan  3–4 Warren French 
First round:
Brendan Dolan  0–3 Kim Huybrechts 
Mark Dudbridge  0–3 Dave Chisnall 
Raymond van Barneveld  0–3 James Richardson 
Mark Walsh  3–1 French

Equestrianism
Show jumping – World Cup, Western European League:
7th competition in London, United Kingdom:  Ben Maher  on Tripple X III  Marcus Ehning  on Sabrina  Dermott Lennon  on Hallmark Elite
Standings (after 7 of 12 competitions): (1) Rolf-Göran Bengtsson  71 points (2) Steve Guerdat  51 (3) Nick Skelton  48

Football (soccer)
FIFA Club World Cup in Yokohama, Japan:
Match for third place: Kashiwa Reysol  0–0 (3–5 pen.)   Al-Sadd
Final:  Santos  0–4   Barcelona
Barcelona win the Cup for the second time in three years.
 Paraguayan Primera División Torneo Clausura, final matchday:
Olimpia 2–1 Rubio Ñu
Sol de América 2–2 Cerro Porteño
Final standings: Olimpia 46 points, Cerro Porteño 43.
Olimpia win the title for the 39th time.
 Costa Rican Primera División Campeonato de Invierno Final, second leg (first leg score in parentheses): Herediano 1–1 (1–1) Alajuelense. 2–2 on aggregate; Alajuelense win 6–5 on penalties.
Alajuelense win the title for the 27th time.
 Categoría Primera A Torneo Finalización Final, first leg: Junior 3–2 Once Caldas
 Liga de Fútbol Profesional Torneo Apertura Final, first leg: The Strongest 2–0 Universitario.

Freestyle skiing
World Cup in Innichen, Italy:
Ski cross men:  Andreas Matt   Egor Korotkov   Alex Fiva 
Ski cross standings (after 2 of 11 races): (1) Korotkov 160 points (2) Matt 132 (3) David Duncan  110
Overall standings: (1) Korotkov 32 points (2) Matt 26 (3) Duncan 22
Ski cross women:  Kelsey Serwa   Sanna Lüdi   Katrin Müller 
Ski cross standings (after 2 of 11 races): (1) Serwa 200 points (2) Lüdi 160 (3) Müller 86
Overall standings: (1) Serwa 40 points (2) Lüdi 32 (3) Hannah Kearney  & Britta Sigourney  20

Handball
World Women's Championship in São Paulo, Brazil:
Seventh place match:  29–32 
Fifth place match:  20–36 
Third place match:  18–24  
Final:   24–32  
Norway win the title for the second time.

Nordic combined
World Cup in Seefeld, Austria:
HS 109 / 10 km:  Jason Lamy-Chappuis  27:41.9  Alessandro Pittin  27:45.8  Jørgen Graabak  27:49.0
Standings (after 8 of 23 races): (1) Lamy-Chappuis 554 points (2) Tino Edelmann  381 (3) Akito Watabe  361

Rugby union
Heineken Cup pool stage Matchday 4:
Pool 1:
Munster  19–13  Scarlets
Northampton Saints  45–0  Castres
Standings (after 4 matches): Munster 16 points, Scarlets 11, Northampton Saints 8, Castres 6.
Pool 6: Toulouse  24–31  Harlequins
Standings (after 4 matches): Toulouse 13 points, Harlequins 12,  Gloucester 9,  Connacht 2.
Amlin Challenge Cup pool stage Matchday 4:
Pool 4: Newport Gwent Dragons  19–23  Exeter Chiefs
Standings (after 4 matches):  Perpignan, Exeter Chiefs 14 points, Newport Gwent Dragons 10,  Cavalieri Prato 0.
Pool 5: Sale Sharks  41–21  Agen
Standings (after 4 matches):  Brive 18 points, Sale Sharks 15, Agen 5,  La Vila 0.

Sailing
World Championships in Perth, Australia:
Women's 470:  Tara Pacheco, Berta Betanzos  63 points  Hannah Mills, Saskia Clark  68  Jo Aleh, Polly Powrie  73
Men's 49er:  Nathan Outteridge, Iain Jensen  91 points  Peter Burling, Blair Tuke  112  Emil Toft Nielssen, Simon Toft Nielssen  112
Men's RS:X:  Dorian van Rijsselberghe  33 points  Piotr Myszka  40  Nimrod Mashiach  52
Men's Laser:  Tom Slingsby  37 points  Nick Thompson  56  Andrew Murdock  59

Snooker
Players Tour Championship – Event 11 in Sheffield, England: Jamie Cope  compiles the 85th official maximum break, and becomes the sixth person to compile more than two official maximum breaks.

Ski jumping
Men's World Cup in Engelberg, Switzerland:
HS 137:  Andreas Kofler  264.7 points  Kamil Stoch  260.8  Anders Bardal  260.5
Standings (after 7 of 27 events): (1) Kofler 508 points (2) Bardal 390 (3) Gregor Schlierenzauer  376

December 17, 2011 (Saturday)

Alpine skiing
Men's World Cup in Val Gardena, Italy:
Downhill: Cancelled due to strong winds.
Women's World Cup in Courchevel, France:
Giant slalom: Cancelled due to heavy snow.

Basketball
FIBA Africa Clubs Champions Cup in Salé, Morocco (teams in bold advance to the quarterfinals):
Group A:
ASB Mazembe  74–62  Urunani
Union Bank  72–93  AS Salé
Al Ahly  72–85  C.R.D. Libolo
Final standings: AS Salé 10 points, C.R.D. Libolo 9, Union Bank 8, ASB Mazembe 7, Al Ahly 6, Urunani 5.
Group B:
Royal Hoopers  63–88  Petro Atlético
Étoile Sportive du Sahel  127–61  Malabo Kings
C.R. Al Hoceima  62–70  Primeiro de Agosto
Final standings: Primeiro de Agosto 10 points, Étoile Sportive du Sahel 9, Petro Atlético 8, C.R. Al Hoceima 7, Malabo Kings 6, Royal Hoopers 4.

Biathlon
World Cup 3 in Hochfilzen, Austria:
12.5 km pursuit men:  Andreas Birnbacher  35:40.3 (0+0+0+0)  Ole Einar Bjørndalen  35:40.5 (0+0+0+0)  Simon Fourcade  35:41.6 (1+0+0+0)
Pursuit standings (after 3 of 8 races): (1) Tarjei Bø  140 points (2) Emil Hegle Svendsen  131 (3) Birnbacher & Benjamin Weger  124
Overall standings (after 7 of 26 races): (1) Bø 308 points (2) Martin Fourcade  289 (3) Svendsen 242
10 km pursuit women:  Olga Zaitseva  31:52.2 (0+0+0+0)  Helena Ekholm  32:21.3 (0+0+0+1)  Darya Domracheva  32:36.9 (1+1+0+1)
Pursuit standings (after 3 of 8 races): (1) Zaitseva 140 points (2) Tora Berger  135 (3) Domracheva 133
Overall standings (after 7 of 26 races): (1) Magdalena Neuner  336 points (2) Domracheva 327 (3) Kaisa Mäkäräinen  301

Bobsleigh
World Cup in Winterberg, Germany (GER unless stated):
2-women:  Cathleen Martini/Janine Tischer 1:56.32 (58.20, 58.12)  Anja Schneiderheinze-Stöckel/Lisette Thöne 1:56.60 (57.88, 58.72)  Fabienne Meyer/Hanne Schenk  1:56.73 (58.20, 58.53)
Standings (after 3 of 8 races): (1) Schneiderheinze-Stöckel 627 points (2) Martini 619 (3) Meyer 576
2-men:  Thomas Florschütz/Kevin Kuske 1:52.98 (56.81, 56.17)  Beat Hefti/Thomas Lamparter  1:53.22 (57.06, 56.16)  Oskars Melbārdis/Daumants Dreiškens  1:53.43 (57.34, 56.09)
Standings (after 3 of 8 races): (1) Florschütz 660 points (2) Hefti 635 (3) Maximilian Arndt 552

Cricket
Sri Lanka in South Africa:
1st Test in Centurion, day 3:  180 & 150 (39.1 overs; Vernon Philander 5/49);  411 (122 overs). South Africa win by an innings & 81 runs; lead 3-match series 1–0.
Pakistan in Bangladesh:
2nd Test in Mirpur, day 1:  234/5 (68 overs; Shakib Al Hasan 108*); .

Cross-country skiing
World Cup in Rogla, Slovenia:
Men's 15 km classic mass start:  Petter Northug  42:42.7  Dario Cologna  42:42.9  Alexey Poltoranin  42:43.8
Distance standings (after 5 of 21 races): (1) Northug 340 points (2) Maurice Manificat  202 (3) Cologna 188
Overall standings (after 9 of 37 races): (1) Northug 600 points (2) Cologna 408 (3) Manificat 266
Women's 10 km classic mass start:  Justyna Kowalczyk  32:49.7  Therese Johaug  33:11.8  Vibeke Skofterud  33:17.1
Distance standings (after 5 of 21 races): (1) Marit Bjørgen  296 points (2) Skofterud 294 (3) Johaug 281
Overall standings (after 9 of 37 races): (1) Bjørgen 582 points (2) Skofterud 479 (3) Johaug 471

Darts
PDC World Championship in London, England:
Preliminary round:
Dietmar Burger  0–4 Christian Perez 
Kevin Münch  4–2 Lee Choon Peng 
First round:
Peter Wright  1–3 Jelle Klaasen 
Ronnie Baxter  2–3 Steve Farmer 
Robert Thornton  3–1 Ian White 
Alan Tabern  3–1 Perez
Steve Beaton  3–2 Magnus Caris 
Vincent van der Voort  3–2 Mark Hylton 
Paul Nicholson  3–1 Mensur Suljović 
Denis Ovens  w/d–w/o Münch

Football (soccer)
 Campeonato Ecuatoriano de Fútbol Serie A Finals, second leg (first leg score in parentheses): Deportivo Quito 1–0 (1–0) Emelec. Deportivo Quito win 2–0 on aggregate.
Deportivo Quito win the title for the fifth time.

Freestyle skiing
World Cup in Innichen, Italy:
Ski cross men:  Brady Leman   Egor Korotkov   David Duncan 
Overall standings: (1) Mikaël Kingsbury , Wing Tai Barrymore  & Leman 20 points
Ski cross women:  Kelsey Serwa   Sanna Lüdi   Marielle Thompson 
Overall standings: (1) Hannah Kearney , Britta Sigourney  & Serwa 20 points

Luge
World Cup 3 in Calgary, Canada (GER unless stated):
Men:  Andi Langenhan 1:29.406 (44.716, 44.690)  Felix Loch 1:29.500 (44.947, 44.553)  David Möller 1:29.657 (44.808, 44.849)
Standings (after 3 of 9 races): (1) Loch 285 points (2) Möller 225 (3) Langenhan 210
Doubles:  Tobias Wendl/Tobias Arlt 1:27.661 (43.795, 43.866)  Andreas Linger/Wolfgang Linger  1:27.693 (43.831, 43.862)  Toni Eggert/Sascha Benecken 1:27.829 (43.912, 43.917)
Standings (after 3 of 9 races): (1) Linger/Linger 255 points (2) Peter Penz/Georg Fischler  211 (3) Wendl/Arlt 210

Mixed martial arts
Strikeforce: Melendez vs. Masvidal in San Diego, California, United States:
Lightweight Championship bout: Gilbert Melendez  (c) def. Jorge Masvidal  via unanimous decision (50–45, 50–45, 49–46)
Women's Featherweight Championship bout: Cristiane Santos  (c) def. Hiroko Yamanaka  via TKO (punches)
Light Heavyweight bout: Gegard Mousasi  def. Ovince St. Preux  via unanimous decision (29–28, 29–28, 29–28)
Lightweight bout: K. J. Noons  def. Billy Evangelista  via unanimous decision (29–28, 29–28, 29–28)

Nordic combined
World Cup in Seefeld, Austria:
HS 109 / 10 km:  Jason Lamy-Chappuis  29:14.5  Akito Watabe  29:15.5  Alessandro Pittin  29:18.0
Standings (after 7 of 23 races): (1) Lamy-Chappuis 454 points (2) Tino Edelmann  368 (3) Watabe 316

Rugby union
Heineken Cup pool stage Matchday 4:
Pool 2: London Irish  19–25  Racing Métro
Standings (after 4 matches):  Cardiff Blues,  Edinburgh 13 points, London Irish 8, Racing Métro 7.
Pool 3:
Montpellier  13–13  Glasgow Warriors
Leinster  52–27  Bath
Standings (after 4 matches): Leinster 16 points, Glasgow Warriors 10, Bath, Montpellier 6.
Pool 4:
Leicester Tigers  23–19  Clermont
Aironi  20–46  Ulster
Standings (after 4 matches): Ulster 14 points, Leicester Tigers 12, Clermont 11, Aironi 0.
Pool 6: Gloucester  23–19  Connacht
Standings:  Toulouse 12 points (3 matches), Gloucester 9 (4),  Harlequins 8 (3), Connacht 2 (4).
Amlin Challenge Cup pool stage Matchday 4:
Pool 1: Worcester Warriors  57–13  București Wolves
Standings (after 4 matches):  Stade Français 19 points, Worcester Warriors 15, București Wolves 5,  Crociati Parma 0.
Pool 2:
Petrarca Padova  3–43  Lyon
Toulon  36–10  Newcastle Falcons
Standings (after 4 matches): Toulon 15 points, Newcastle Falcons 13, Lyon 10, Petrarca Padova 0.
Pool 4: Cavalieri Prato  13–30  Perpignan
Standings: Perpignan 14 points (4 matches), Exeter Chiefs 10 (3), Newport Gwent Dragons 9 (3), Cavalieri Prato 0 (4).

Sailing
World Championships in Perth, Australia:
Men's Star:  Robert Scheidt, Bruno Prada  45 points,  Robert Stanjek, Frithjof Kleen  61  Mark Mendelblatt, Brian Fatih  73

Skeleton
World Cup in Winterberg, Germany:
Men:  Martins Dukurs  57.90  Frank Rommel  58.22  Aleksandr Tretyakov  58.29
Standings (after 3 of 8 races): (1) Dukurs 675 points (2) Tretyakov 610 (3) Rommel 586
Women:  Amy Gough  1:00.16  Katharina Heinz  1:00.24  Marion Thees  1:00.26
Standings (after 3 of 8 races): (1) Olga Potylitsina  585 points (2) Mellisa Hollingsworth  545 (3) Thees 536

Ski jumping
Men's World Cup in Engelberg, Switzerland (AUT unless stated):
HS 137:  Anders Bardal  266.2 points  Martin Koch 258.1  Thomas Morgenstern 257.4
Standings (after 6 of 27 events): (1) Andreas Kofler 408 points (2) Bardal 330 (3) Gregor Schlierenzauer 326

Snooker
Players Tour Championship – Event 11 in Sheffield, England: Ding Junhui  compiles the 84th official maximum break, and becomes the fourth person to compile more than three official maximum breaks.

Snowboarding
World Cup in Telluride, United States:
Men's snowboard cross team:  Pierre Vaultier/Xavier de Le Rue   Nick Baumgartner/Jonathan Cheever   Joachim Havikhagen/Stian Sivertzen 
Women's snowboard cross team:  Nelly Moenne Loccoz/Déborah Anthonioz   Dominique Maltais/Maëlle Ricker   Lindsey Jacobellis/Callan Chythlook-Sifsof 
World Cup in Ruka, Finland:
Halfpipe men:  Markus Malin  94.0 points  Steve Krijbolder  88.0  Aleksi Kumpulainen  83.3
Halfpipe standings: (1) Janne Korpi  1600 points (2) Malin 1150 (3) Ryō Aono  1040
Freestyle Overall standings: (1) Korpi 2620 points (2) Dimi de Jong  1480 (3) Niklas Mattsson  1160
Halfpipe women:  Lucile Lefèvre  81.3 points  Emma Bernard  80.0  Ella Suitiala  67.3
Halfpipe standings & Freestyle Overall standings: (1) Lefèvre 1290 points (2) Ursina Haller  1200 (3) Queralt Castellet  1180

December 16, 2011 (Friday)

Alpine skiing
Men's World Cup in Val Gardena, Italy:
Super giant slalom:  Beat Feuz  1:21.51  Bode Miller  1:21.81  Kjetil Jansrud  1:21.95
Super-G standings (after 3 of 8 races): (1) Aksel Lund Svindal  230 points (2) Feuz 171 (3) Didier Cuche  121
Overall standings (after 9 of 45 races): (1) Svindal 384 points (2) Feuz 360 (3) Ted Ligety  309

Basketball
FIBA Africa Clubs Champions Cup in Salé, Morocco:
Group A:
C.R.D. Libolo  83–56  Urunani
Al Ahly  61–83  Union Bank
AS Salé  70–56  ASB Mazembe
Standings (after 4 games): AS Salé 8 points, C.R.D. Libolo, Union Bank 7, ASB Mazembe, Al Ahly 5, Urunani 4.
Group B:
Malabo Kings  51–101  Petro Atlético
Étoile Sportive du Sahel  84–62  C.R. Al Hoceima
Primeiro de Agosto  95–69  Royal Hoopers
Standings (after 4 games): Primeiro de Agosto 8 points, Étoile Sportive du Sahel 7, Petro Atlético, C.R. Al Hoceima 6, Malabo Kings 5, Royal Hoopers 3.

Biathlon
World Cup 3 in Hochfilzen, Austria:
7.5 km sprint women:  Olga Zaitseva  20:36.6 (0+1)  Darya Domracheva  20:50.5 (1+1)  Helena Ekholm  21:06.8 (1+0)
Sprint standings (after 3 of 10 races): (1) Magdalena Neuner  163 points (2) Kaisa Mäkäräinen  & Domracheva 134
Overall standings (after 6 of 26 races): (1) Neuner 307 points (2) Domracheva 279 (3) Mäkäräinen 261

Cricket
Sri Lanka in South Africa:
1st Test in Centurion, day 2:  180;  389/9 (118 overs). South Africa lead by 209 runs with 1 wicket remaining in the 1st innings.

Darts
PDC World Championship in London, England:
Preliminary round: Haruki Muramatsu  4–2 Dennis Nilsson 
First round:
Justin Pipe  3–1 Sean Reed 
Co Stompé  3–0 Michael Smith 
Wes Newton  3–0 Kurt van de Rijck 
Phil Taylor  3–0 Muramatsu

Handball
World Women's Championship in São Paulo, Brazil:
5th–8th semifinals:
 41–31 
 31–32 
Semifinals:
 28–23 
 30–22

Luge
World Cup 3 in Calgary, Canada:
Women:  Alex Gough  1:34.212 (47.153, 47.059)  Tatjana Hüfner  1:34.324 (47.176, 47.148)  Tatiana Ivanova  1:34.724 (47.290, 47.434)
Standings (after 3 of 9 races): (1) Hüfner 270 points (2) Gough 230 (3) Natalie Geisenberger  210

Nordic combined
World Cup in Seefeld, Austria:
HS 109 / Team sprint:  Sébastien Lacroix/Jason Lamy-Chappuis  41:30.1  Lukas Runggaldier/Alessandro Pittin  41:32.3  Mikko Kokslien/Magnus Krog  41:34.2

Rugby union
Heineken Cup pool stage Matchday 4:
Pool 2: Edinburgh  19–12  Cardiff Blues
Standings: Edinburgh, Cardiff Blues 13 points (4 matches),  London Irish 7 (3),  Racing Métro 3 (3).
Pool 5:
Ospreys  13–16  Saracens
Biarritz  29–12  Benetton Treviso
Standings (after 4 matches): Saracens 14 points, Biarritz 12, Ospreys 8, Benetton Treviso 6.

Sailing
World Championships in Perth, Australia:
Women's match racing:
Petite final: Ekaterina Skudina, Elena Siuzeva, Elena Oblova  1–3  Claire Leroy, Élodie Bertrand, Marie Riou 
Final:  Lucy MacGregor, Annie Lush, Kate McGregor  0–4  Anna Tunnicliffe, Deborah Capozzi, Molly Vandemoer

Snowboarding
World Cup in Telluride, United States:
Snowboard cross men:  Pierre Vaultier   Christopher Robanske   Nick Baumgartner 
Snowboard cross women:  Lindsey Jacobellis   Dominique Maltais   Déborah Anthonioz

December 15, 2011 (Thursday)

Basketball
Euroleague Regular Season Matchday 9 (teams in bold advance to the Top 16):
Group A:
Fenerbahçe Ülker  70–80  Gescrap Bizkaia
Olympiacos  86–61  Bennet Cantù
Standings:  Caja Laboral, Bennet Cantù, Fenerbahçe Ülker, Olympiacos 5–4, Gescrap Bizkaia 4–5,  SLUC Nancy 3–6.
Group B: Brose Baskets  68–82  Žalgiris Kaunas
Standings:  CSKA Moscow 9–0,  Panathinaikos 6–3,  Unicaja 4–5, Žalgiris Kaunas, Brose Baskets 3–6,  KK Zagreb 2–7.
Group C: Maccabi Tel Aviv  96–57  Anadolu Efes
Standings:  Real Madrid 7–2, Maccabi Tel Aviv 6–3, Anadolu Efes 5–4,  Partizan Mt:s Belgrade 4–5,  EA7 Emporio Armani 3–6,  Spirou Charleroi 2–7.
Group D:
UNICS Kazan  68–41  Asseco Prokom Gdynia
Montepaschi Siena  77–74  FC Barcelona Regal
Standings: FC Barcelona Regal 8–1, Montepaschi Siena 7–2, UNICS Kazan 6–3,  Galatasaray Medical Park 4–5, Asseco Prokom Gdynia,  Union Olimpija Ljubljana 1–8.
FIBA Africa Clubs Champions Cup in Salé, Morocco:
Group A: ASB Mazembe  75–62  Al Ahly
Standings (after 3 games):  AS Salé 6 points,  C.R.D. Libolo,  Union Bank 5, ASB Mazembe, Al Ahly 4,  Urunani 3.
Group B:
Royal Hoopers  57–73  Étoile Sportive du Sahel
C.R. Al Hoceima  66–60  Royal Hoopers
Standings (after 3 games):  Primeiro de Agosto 6 points, C.R. Al Hoceima, Étoile Sportive du Sahel 5,  Petro Atlético,  Malabo Kings 4, Royal Hoopers 2.

Biathlon
World Cup 3 in Hochfilzen, Austria:
10 km sprint men:  Tarjei Bø  23:57.2 (1+0)  Martin Fourcade  24:01.2 (1+1)  Timofey Lapshin  24:14.4 (0+0)
Sprint standings (after 3 of 10 races): (1) Bø 152 points (2) Carl Johan Bergman  120 (3) Fourcade 116
Overall standings (after 6 of 26 races): (1) Bø 265 points (2) Fourcade 253 (3) Bergman & Emil Hegle Svendsen  225

Cricket
Sri Lanka in South Africa:
1st Test in Centurion, day 1:  180 (47.4 overs; Vernon Philander 5/53);  90/1 (34 overs). South Africa trail by 90 runs with 9 wickets remaining in the 1st innings.

Darts
2012 World Championship in London, England:
Preliminary round: Paul Barham  2–4 Scott MacKenzie 
First round:
Jamie Caven  1–3 Roland Scholten 
Mark Webster  2–3 Richie Burnett 
Adrian Lewis  3–2 Nigel Heydon 
Wayne Jones  3–1 MacKenzie

Football (soccer)
FIFA Club World Cup in Yokohama, Japan:
Semi-finals: Al-Sadd  0–4  Barcelona
UEFA Europa League group stage Matchday 6 (teams in bold advance to the round of 32):
Group A:
PAOK  1–1  Rubin Kazan
Shamrock Rovers  0–4  Tottenham Hotspur
Final standings: PAOK 12 points, Rubin Kazan 11, Tottenham Hotspur 10, Shamrock Rovers 0.
Group B:
Hannover 96  3–1  Vorskla Poltava
Copenhagen  0–1  Standard Liège
Final standings: Standard Liège 14 points, Hannover 96 11, Copenhagen 5, Vorskla Poltava 2.
Group C:
Hapoel Tel Aviv  2–0  Legia Warsaw
PSV Eindhoven  2–1  Rapid București
Final standings: PSV Eindhoven 16 points, Legia Warsaw 9, Hapoel Tel Aviv 7, Rapid București 3.
Group G:
AZ  1–1  Metalist Kharkiv
Austria Wien  2–0  Malmö FF
Final standings: Metalist Kharkiv 14 points, Arizona, Austria Wien 8, Malmö FF 1.
Group H:
Club Brugge  1–1  Braga
Birmingham City  1–0  Maribor
Final standings: Club Brugge, Braga 11 points, Birmingham City 10, Maribor 1.
Group I:
Udinese  1–1  Celtic
Atlético Madrid  3–1  Rennes
Final standings: Atlético Madrid 13 points, Udinese 9, Celtic 6, Rennes 3.

Rugby union
Amlin Challenge Cup pool stage Matchday 4:
Pool 1: Stade Français  45–3  Crociati Parma
Standings: Stade Français 19 points (4 matches),  Worcester Warriors 10 (3),  București Wolves 5 (3), Crociati Parma 0 (4).
Pool 3:
Bordeaux Bègles  15–10  Rovigo
London Wasps  25–11  Bayonne
Standings (after 4 matches): London Wasps 14 points, Bayonne 13, Bordeaux Bègles 9, Rovigo 1.
Pool 5: Brive  38–13  La Vila
Standings: Brive 18 points (4 matches),  Sale Sharks 10 (3),  Agen 5 (3), La Vila 0 (4).

Snooker
For the first time in professional snooker, two maximum breaks are compiled on the same day, at the FFB Open. Matthew Stevens  compiles the 82nd and Ding Junhui  the 83rd; Ding also becomes the fifth person to compile more than two official maximum breaks.

Snowboarding
World Cup in Telluride, United States:
Giant slalom men:  Benjamin Karl   Andreas Prommegger   Simon Schoch 
Giant slalom standings (after 2 of 11 events) & Overall standings: (1) Karl 1450 points (2) Prommegger 1400 (3) Aaron March  1250
Giant slalom women:  Julia Dujmovits   Fränzi Mägert-Kohli   Amelie Kober 
Giant slalom standings (after 2 of 11 events) & Overall standings: (1) Mägert-Kohli 1800 points (2) Dujmovits 1360 (3) Yekaterina Tudegesheva  1090

December 14, 2011 (Wednesday)

Basketball
Euroleague Regular Season Matchday 9 (teams in bold advance to the Top 16):
Group A: Caja Laboral  90–55  SLUC Nancy
Standings:  Fenerbahçe Ülker,  Bennet Cantù 5–3, Caja Laboral 5–4,  Olympiacos 4–4,  Gescrap Bizkaia 3–5, SLUC Nancy 3–6.
Group B:
CSKA Moscow  91–75  Panathinaikos
KK Zagreb  67–82  Unicaja
Standings: CSKA Moscow 9–0, Panathinaikos 6–3, Unicaja 4–5,  Brose Baskets 3–5,  Žalgiris Kaunas 2–6, KK Zagreb 2–7.
Group C:
EA7 Emporio Armani  88–53  Spirou Charleroi
Real Madrid  101–83  Partizan Mt:s Belgrade
Standings: Real Madrid 7–2,  Anadolu Efes,  Maccabi Tel Aviv 5–3, Partizan Mt:s Belgrade 4–5, EA7 Emporio Armani 3–6, Spirou Charleroi 2–7.
Group D: Galatasaray Medical Park  80–59  Union Olimpija Ljubljana
Standings:  FC Barcelona Regal 8–0,  Montepaschi Siena 6–2,  UNICS Kazan 5–3, Galatasaray Medical Park 4–5,  Asseco Prokom Gdynia 1–7, Union Olimpija Ljubljana 1–8.
FIBA Africa Clubs Champions Cup in Salé, Morocco:
Group A:
Urunani  44–84  Union Bank
C.R.D. Libolo  64–62   ASB Mazembe
AS Salé  87–83  Al Ahly
Standings: AS Salé 6 points (3 games), C.R.D. Libolo, Union Bank 5 (3), Al Ahly 3 (2), Urunani 3 (3), ASB Mazembe 2 (2).
Group B:
Malabo Kings  20–0  Royal Hoopers
Petro Atlético  74–59  C.R. Al Hoceima
Primeiro de Agosto  79–62  Étoile Sportive du Sahel
Standings: Primeiro de Agosto 6 points (3 games), Petro Atlético, Malabo Kings 4 (3), C.R. Al Hoceima, Étoile Sportive du Sahel 3 (2), Royal Hoopers 0 (1).

Football (soccer)
FIFA Club World Cup in Toyota, Japan:
Match for fifth place: Espérance  2–3  Monterrey
Semi-finals: Kashiwa Reysol  1–3  Santos
Copa Sudamericana Finals second leg (first leg score in parentheses): Universidad de Chile  3–0 (1–0)  LDU Quito. Universidad de Chile win 6–0 on points.
Universidad become the first Chilean team to win the Copa Sudamericana.
UEFA Europa League group stage Matchday 6 (teams in bold advance to the round of 32):
Group D:
Zürich  2–0  Vaslui
Lazio  2–0  Sporting CP
Final standings: Sporting CP 12 points, Lazio 9, Vaslui 6, Zürich 3.
Group E:
Dynamo Kyiv  3–3  Maccabi Tel Aviv
Beşiktaş  3–1  Stoke City
Final standings: Beşiktaş 12 points, Stoke City 11, Dynamo Kyiv 7, Maccabi Tel Aviv 2.
Group F:
Slovan Bratislava  2–3  Red Bull Salzburg
Paris Saint-Germain  4–2  Athletic Bilbao
Final standings: Athletic Bilbao 13 points, Red Bull Salzburg, Paris Saint-Germain 10, Slovan Bratislava 1.
Group J:
Maccabi Haifa  0–3  Schalke 04
Steaua București  3–1  AEK Larnaca
Final standings: Schalke 04 14 points, Steaua București 8, Maccabi Haifa 6, AEK Larnaca 5.
Group K:
Wisła Kraków  2–1  Twente
Fulham  2–2  Odense
Final standings: Twente 13 points, Wisła Kraków 9, Fulham 8, Odense 4.
Group L:
Sturm Graz  1–3  AEK Athens
Anderlecht  5–3  Lokomotiv Moscow
Final standings: Anderlecht 18 points, Lokomotiv Moscow 12, AEK Athens, Sturm Graz 3.
 Torneo Descentralizado Play-offs, third leg: Juan Aurich 0–0 Alianza Lima. 2–2 on aggregate, Juan Aurich win 3–1 on penalties.
Juan Aurich win the title for the first time.

Handball
World Women's Championship in São Paulo, Brazil, Quarterfinals:
 23–25 
 23–28 
 25–30 
 27–26

December 13, 2011 (Tuesday)

Basketball
FIBA Africa Clubs Champions Cup in Salé, Morocco:
Group A:
Urunani  51–70  Al Ahly
GDR Libolo  75–78  AS Salé
Union Bank  68–49  ASB Mazembe
Group B:
Malabo Kings  51–101  Primeiro de Agosto
Petro Atlético  76–86  Étoile Sportive du Sahel

December 12, 2011 (Monday)

Basketball
FIBA Africa Clubs Champions Cup in Salé, Morocco:
Group A:
Union Bank  80–85  C.R.D. Libolo
AS Salé  110–43  Urunani
Group B:
C.R. Al Hoceima  116–46  Malabo Kings
Primeiro de Agosto  90–69  Petro Atlético

Cricket
Pakistan in Bangladesh:
1st Test in Chittagong, day 4:  135 & 275 (82.3 overs);  594/5d. Pakistan win by an innings & 184 runs; lead 2-match series 1–0.
New Zealand in Australia:
2nd Test in Hobart, day 4:  150 & 226;  136 & 233 (63.4 overs; David Warner 123*, Doug Bracewell 6/40). New Zealand win by 7 runs; 2-match series drawn 1–1.
Australia retain the Trans-Tasman Trophy.

Handball
World Women's Championship in Brazil, Last 16:
 23–26 
 27–28 
 23–22 (a.e.t.) 
 35–22

December 11, 2011 (Sunday)

Athletics
European Cross Country Championships in Velenje, Slovenia:
Men:  Atelaw Yeshetela  29:15  Ayad Lamdassem  29:20  José Rocha  29:21
Women:  Fionnuala Britton  25:55  Ana Dulce Félix  26:02  Gemma Steel  26:04

Biathlon
World Cup 2 in Hochfilzen, Austria:
4×7.5 km Relay Men:   (Rune Brattsveen, Lars Berger, Emil Hegle Svendsen, Tarjei Bø) 1:14:52.9 (1+7)   (Anton Shipulin, Andrei Makoveev, Evgeny Ustyugov, Dmitry Malyshko) 1:15:06.8 (0+5)   (Vincent Jay, Simon Fourcade, Alexis Bœuf, Martin Fourcade) 1:15:23.9 (0+6)
4×6 km Relay Women:   (Fanny Welle-Strand Horn, Elise Ringen, Synnøve Solemdal, Tora Berger) 1:07:13.3 (0+10)   (Marie-Laure Brunet, Anaïs Bescond, Sophie Boilley, Marie Dorin Habert) 1:07:26.9 (0+3)   (Svetlana Sleptsova, Natalia Guseva, Anna Bogaliy-Titovets, Olga Zaitseva) 1:07:42.7 (0+6)

Bobsleigh
World Cup in La Plagne, France (GER unless stated):
Four-man:  Manuel Machata/Florian Becke/Andreas Bredau/Christian Poser 1:57.00 (58.48, 58.52)  Maximilian Arndt/Rene Tiefert/Jan Speer/Martin Putze 1:57.24 (58.58, 58.66)  Thomas Florschütz/Gino Gerhardi/Kevin Kuske/Thomas Blaschek 1:57.26 (58.66, 58.60)
Standings (after 2 of 8 races): (1) Alexandr Zubkov  409 points (2) Machata 401 (3) Florschütz 400

Cricket
Pakistan in Bangladesh:
1st Test in Chittagong, day 3:  135 & 134/4 (39 overs);  594/5d (176.5 overs; Younis Khan 200*, Asad Shafiq 104). Bangladesh trail by 325 runs with 6 wickets remaining.
New Zealand in Australia:
2nd Test in Hobart, day 3:  150 & 226 (78.3 overs);  136 & 72/0 (19 overs). Australia require another 169 runs with 10 wickets remaining.
West Indies in India:
5th ODI in Chennai:  267/6 (50 overs; Manoj Tiwary 104 r/h);  233 (44.1 overs; Kieron Pollard 119). India win by 34 runs; win 5-match series 4–1.

Cross-country skiing
World Cup in Davos, Switzerland:
Men's Sprint Freestyle:  Alexei Petukhov  2:41.7  Teodor Peterson  2:42.0  Emil Jönsson  2:42.1
Sprint standings (after 3 of 13 races): (1) Petukhov 208 points (2) Peterson 175 (3) Ola Vigen Hattestad  111
Overall standings (after 8 of 37 races): (1) Petter Northug  500 points (2) Dario Cologna  322 (3) Johan Olsson  259
Women's Sprint Freestyle:  Kikkan Randall  3:02.4  Natalya Matveyeva  3:04.1  Maiken Caspersen Falla  3:04.1
Sprint standings (after 3 of 13 races): (1) Randall 240 points (2) Matveyeva 194 (3) Hanna Brodin  121
Overall standings (after 8 of 37 races): (1) Marit Bjørgen  582 points (2) Vibeke Skofterud  411 (3) Randall 393

Equestrianism
Show jumping – World Cup:
Western European League, 6th competition in Geneva, Switzerland:  Álvaro de Miranda Neto  on Ashleigh Drossel Dan  Rolf-Göran Bengtsson  on Casall  Patrice Delaveau  on Orient Express
Standings (after 6 of 12 competitions): (1) Bengtsson 59 points (2) Steve Guerdat  51 (3) Nick Skelton  48
Central European League – North Sub-League, 11th competition in Poznań, Poland:  Jörne Sprehe  on Contifax  Camila Mazza de Benedicto  on Willink  Henk van de Pol  on Chesterfield
Pacific League – Australia, 13th competition in Sydney:  Billy Raymont  on Ocean Beach NZPH  Thomas McDermott  on Limerick  Catherine Green  on Da Vinci's Pride

Field hockey
Men's Champions Trophy in Auckland, New Zealand:
Seventh place match:  5–4 (a.e.t.) 
Fifth place match:  1–0 
Third place match:  3–5  
Final:   1–0  
Australia win the Trophy for the fourth successive time and 12th time overall.

Figure skating
ISU Grand Prix:
Grand Prix Final and Junior Grand Prix Final in Quebec City, Canada:
Ice dancing:  Meryl Davis / Charlie White  188.55 points  Tessa Virtue / Scott Moir  183.34  Nathalie Péchalat / Fabian Bourzat  169.69
Davis and White win the title for the third successive time.

Football (soccer)
FIFA Club World Cup in Japan:
Quarter-finals in Toyota:
Espérance  1–2  Al-Sadd
Kashiwa Reysol  1–1 (4–3 pen.)  Monterrey
 Primera División de México Apertura Liguilla Final Second leg (first leg score in parentheses): Tigres UANL 3–1 (1–0) Santos Laguna. Tigres UANL win 4–1 on aggregate.
Tigres UANL win the title for the third time.
 Campeonato Ecuatoriano de Fútbol Serie A Finals, first leg: Emelec 0–1 Deportivo Quito

Golf
European Tour:
Dubai World Championship in Dubai, United Arab Emirates:
Winner: Álvaro Quirós  269 (−19)
Quirós wins his sixth European Tour title.
Final Race to Dubai standings (prize money in €): (1) Luke Donald  5,323,400 (2) Rory McIlroy  4,002,168 (3) Martin Kaymer  3,489,033
Donald becomes the first player to finish top of the money list on the PGA and European Tours in the same season.

Handball
World Women's Championship in Brazil, Last 16:
 29–30 
 30–19 
 34–22 
 19–23

Nine-ball pool
Mosconi Cup in Las Vegas, United States:
Team Europe  11–7  Team USA
Nick van den Berg  2–6 Shane Van Boening 
Darren Appleton  3–6 Johnny Archer 
Niels Feijen  6–4 Rodney Morris 
Europe win the title for the second consecutive time and sixth time overall.

Nordic combined
World Cup in Ramsau, Austria:
HS 98 / 10 km:  Jason Lamy-Chappuis  22:07.4  Magnus Krog  22:07.8  Mario Stecher  22:08.0
Standings (after 6 of 23 races): (1) Lamy-Chappuis 354 points (2) Tino Edelmann  350 (3) Krog 275

Rugby union
Heineken Cup pool stage Matchday 3:
Pool 3:
Glasgow Warriors  20–15  Montpellier
Bath  13–18  Leinster
Standings (after 3 matches): Leinster 11 points, Glasgow Warriors 8, Bath 6, Montpellier 4.
Pool 4: Clermont  30–12  Leicester Tigers
Standings (after 3 matches): Clermont 10 points,  Ulster 9, Leicester Tigers 8,  Aironi 0.
Amlin Challenge Cup pool stage Matchday 3:
Pool 1: București Wolves  13–24  Worcester Warriors
Standings (after 3 matches):  Stade Français 14 points, Worcester Warriors 10, București Wolves 5,  Crociati Parma 0.
Pool 4: Exeter Chiefs  18–6  Newport Gwent Dragons
Standings (after 3 matches): Exeter Chiefs 10 points,  Perpignan, Newport Gwent Dragons 9,  Cavalieri Prato 0.

Sailing
World Championships in Perth, Australia:
Men's 470:  Mathew Belcher / Malcolm Page  28 points  Luke Patience / Stuart Bithell  40  Sime Fantela / Igor Marenic  62
Men's Finn:  Giles Scott  30 points  Pieter-Jan Postma  31  Edward Martin Wright  45
Women's Laser Radial:  Marit Boumeester  49 points  Evi Van Acker  53  Paige Railey  71
Women's RS:X:  Lee Korzits  31 points  Zofia Noceti-Klepacka  33  Marina Alabau  45
Korzits wins the title for the second time and becomes the first Israeli in any sport to win multiple world championships.

Short track speed skating
World Cup 4 in Shanghai, China:
500m men:  Charles Hamelin  40.905  Jon Eley  41.054  Liang Wenhao  41.178
Standings (after 6 of 8 races): (1) Olivier Jean  3000 points (2) Liang 2804 (3) Eley 2719
1000m men:  Kwak Yoon-Gy  1:25.300  Jean 1:25.451  Noh Jin-Kyu  1:25.971
Standings (after 5 of 8 races): (1) Kwak 4312 points (2) Noh 2096 (3) Hamelin 2000
5000m relay men:   (Liang, Song Weilong, Yu Yongjun, Wu Dajing) 6:38.567   (Hamelin, Michael Gilday, Jean, Rémi Beaulieu-Tinker) 6:48.858   (Jack Whelbourne, Eley, Paul Stanley, Richard Shoebridge) 7:02.363
Standings (after 4 of 6 races): (1)  2664 points (2) Canada 2650 (3) China 2538
500m women:  Arianna Fontana  44.026  Liu Qiuhong  44.111  Fan Kexin  44.320
Standings (after 6 of 8 races): (1) Martina Valcepina  3470 points (2) Liu 3294 (3) Fontana 3000
1000m women:  Katherine Reutter  1:32.721  Li Jianrou  1:32.864  Yui Sakai  1:32.882
Standings (after 5 of 8 races): (1) Sakai 3050 points (2) Elise Christie  2230 (3) Li 1962
3000m relay Women:   (Liu, Li, Xiao Han, Fan) 4:12.394   (Lana Gehring, Alyson Dudek, Reutter, Jessica Smith) 4:13.000   (Ayuko Ito, Sayuri Shimizu, Sakai, Marie Yoshida) 4:13.763
Standings (after 4 of 6 races): (1) China 3640 points (2) Japan 2408 (3)  1948

Ski jumping
Men's World Cup in Harrachov, Czech Republic:
HS 142:  Richard Freitag  292.4 points  Thomas Morgenstern  283.9  Severin Freund  277.8
Standings (after 5 of 27 events): (1) Andreas Kofler  358 points (2) Gregor Schlierenzauer  302 (3) Freitag 294

Snooker
UK Championship Final in York, England: Judd Trump  10–8 Mark Allen 
Trump wins his second ranking title, and the seventh professional title of his career.

Swimming
European Short Course Championships in Szczecin, Poland:
200m freestyle men:  Paul Biedermann  1:42.92  Filippo Magnini  1:43.20  László Cseh  1:43.71
100m backstroke men:  Radosław Kawecki  50.43  Aschwin Wildeboer  50.61  Pavel Sankovich  51.14
200m breaststroke men:  Dániel Gyurta  2:02.37  Vyacheslav Sinkevich  2:03.61  Michael Jamieson  2:03.77
50m butterfly men:  Andriy Govorov  22.70  Amaury Leveaux  22.74  Konrad Czerniak  22.77
100m individual medley men:  Peter Mankoč  52.70  Markus Deibler  53.04  Martti Aljand  53.37
4 × 50 m freestyle relay men:   (Luca Dotto, Marco Orsi, Federico Bocchia, Andrea Rolla) 1:24.82   (Sergey Fesikov, Yevgeny Lagunov, Andrey Grechin, Nikita Konovalov) 1:25.11   (François Heersbrandt, Emmanuel Vanluchene, Louis Croenen, Jasper Aerents) 1:25.83
50m freestyle women:  Britta Steffen  24.01  Jeanette Ottesen  24.11  Triin Aljand  24.23
200m freestyle women:  Silke Lippok  1:54.08  Melanie Costa Schmid  1:54.31  Evelyn Verrasztó  1:54.55
200m backstroke women:  Daryna Zevina  2:02.25 (CR)  Duane Da Rocha Marcé  2:03.32  Melanie Nocher  2:04.29
100m breaststroke women:  Valentina Artemyeva  1:05.19  Rikke Møller Pedersen  1:05.23  Daria Deeva  1:05.83
100m butterfly women:  Ottesen 56.22  Jemma Lowe  56.67  Ilaria Bianchi  57.42
400m individual medley women:  Mireia Belmonte García  4:24.55 (CR)  Hannah Miley  4:26.06  Zsuzsanna Jakabos  4:27.86

December 10, 2011 (Saturday)

Biathlon
World Cup 2 in Hochfilzen, Austria:
12.5 km Pursuit Men:  Emil Hegle Svendsen  33:09.0 (1+0+1+0)  Tarjei Bø  33:09.1 (0+0+1+0)  Benjamin Weger  33:13.9 (1+0+0+0)
Pursuit standings (after 2 of 8 races): (1) Svendsen 114 points (2) Bø 97 (3) Weger 84
Overall standings (after 5 of 26 races): (1) Carl Johan Bergman  & Svendsen 225 points (3) Bø 205
10 km Pursuit Women:  Darya Domracheva  29:34.4 (1+0+1+0)  Olga Zaitseva  29:34.7 (0+0+0+1)  Magdalena Neuner  29:37.5 (0+0+0+2)
Pursuit standings (after 2 of 8 races): (1) Neuner 96 points (2) Tora Berger  92 (3) Domracheva 85
Overall standings (after 5 of 26 races): (1) Neuner 264 points (2) Kaisa Mäkäräinen  229 (3) Domracheva 225

Bobsleigh
World Cup in La Plagne, France:
Two-man:  Thomas Florschütz/Kevin Kuske  1:58.50 (59.39, 59.11)  Steven Holcomb/Steven Langton  1:58.85 (59.48, 59.37)  Beat Hefti/Thomas Lamparter  1:58.91 (59.53, 59.38)
Standings (after 2 of 8 races): (1) Florschütz 435 points (2) Hefti 425 (3) Holcomb 410

Cricket
Pakistan in Bangladesh:
1st Test in Chittagong, day 2:  135;  415/4 (128 overs; Mohammad Hafeez 143). Pakistan lead by 280 runs with 6 wickets remaining in the 1st innings.
New Zealand in Australia:
2nd Test in Hobart, day 2:  150 & 139/3 (44 overs);  136 (51 overs). New Zealand lead by 153 runs with 7 wickets remaining.

Cross-country skiing
World Cup in Davos, Switzerland (NOR unless stated):
Men's 30 km Freestyle Individual:  Petter Northug 1:07:43.8  Maurice Manificat  1:08:35.2  Lukáš Bauer  1:08:43.3
Distance standings (after 4 of 21 races): (1) Northug 240 points (2) Johan Olsson  169 (3) Manificat 151
Overall standings (after 7 of 37 races): (1) Northug 455 points (2) Dario Cologna  286 (3) Olsson 259
Women's 15 km Freestyle Individual:  Marit Bjørgen 35:59.5  Vibeke Skofterud 36:41.3  Therese Johaug 36:41.7
Distance standings (after 4 of 21 races): (1) Bjørgen 296 points (2) Skofterud 226 (3) Johaug 186
Overall standings (after 7 of 37 races): (1) Bjørgen 546 points (2) Skofterud 389 (3) Johaug 376

Curling
European Championships in Moscow, Russia:
Men:
World Challenge Game 2:  10–6 
France win the challenge 2–0 and qualify for the World Championship.
Gold Medal Game:   6–7  
Norway win the title for the second successive time and fifth time overall.
Women:
World Challenge Game 2:  7–4 
Czech Republic win the challenge 2–0 and qualify for the World Championship.
Gold Medal Game:   2–8  
Scotland win the title for the second time.

Field hockey
Men's Champions Trophy in Auckland, New Zealand:
Pool C (teams in bold advance to the final):
 1–3 
 2–1 
Final standings: Australia 9 points, Spain 6, New Zealand, Netherlands 1.
Pool D:
 5–0 
 4–3 
Final standings: Germany 7 points, Great Britain 6, Pakistan 3, Korea 1.

Figure skating
ISU Grand Prix:
Grand Prix Final and Junior Grand Prix Final in Quebec City, Canada:
Ladies:  Carolina Kostner  187.48 points  Akiko Suzuki  179.76  Alena Leonova  176.42
Men:  Patrick Chan  260.30 points  Daisuke Takahashi  249.12  Javier Fernández  247.55
Pairs:  Aliona Savchenko/Robin Szolkowy  212.26 points  Tatiana Volosozhar/Maxim Trankov  212.08  Yuko Kavaguti/Alexander Smirnov  187.77
Junior ice dancing (all RUS):  Victoria Sinitsina / Ruslan Zhiganshin 147.53 points  Anna Yanovskaia / Sergei Mozgov 136.61  Alexandra Stepanova / Ivan Bukin 135.17
Junior men:  Jason Brown  208.41 points  Yan Han  205.93  Joshua Farris  203.98

Football (soccer)
CAF U-23 Championship in Marrakech, Morocco:
Third Place Play-off:  0–2  
Final:   2–1  
Gabon win the title for the first time.
Gabon, Morocco and Egypt qualify for 2012 Olympics, Senegal advances to AFC-CAF playoffs.
CECAFA Cup in Dar es Salaam, Tanzania:
Third place play-off:   1–0 
Final:   2–2 (2–3 pen.)  
Uganda win the Cup for the 12th time.
OFC Champions League group stage Matchday 3:
Group B: Hekari United  3–1  Koloale
Standings:  Auckland City 6 points (2 matches),  Amicale 4 (2), Hekari United 4 (3), Koloale 0 (3).

Freestyle skiing
World Cup in Rukatunturi, Finland (USA unless stated):
Moguls men:  Mikaël Kingsbury  25.00 points  Sho Kashima 21.71  Anthony Benna  16.28
Overall standings: (1) Kingsbury & Wing Tai Barrymore 20 points (3) Kashima & Torin Yater-Wallace 16
Muguls women:  Hannah Kearney 24.70 points  Eliza Outtrim 22.25  Nikola Sudová  21.70
Overall standings: (1) Kearney & Brita Sigourney 20 points (3) Outtrim & Rosalind Groenewoud  16

Luge
World Cup 2 in Whistler, Canada:
Women:  Natalie Geisenberger  1:23.439 (41.748, 41.691)  Tatjana Hüfner  1:23.482 (41.700, 41.782)  Tatiana Ivanova  1:23.606 (41.796, 41.810)
Standings (after 2 of 9 races): (1) Hüfner 185 points (2) Geisenberger 160 (3) Anke Wischnewski  140
Team relay:   (Geisenberger, Felix Loch, Ronny Pietrasik/Christian Weise) 2:18.773 (45.026, 46.717, 47.030)   (Alex Gough, Samuel Edney, Tristan Walker/Justin Snith 2:19.001 (45.073, 46.681, 47.247)   (Ivanova, Albert Demtschenko, Vladislav Yuzhakov/Vladimir Makhnutin) 2:19.162 (45.130, 46.822, 47.210)
Standings (after 2 of 6 races): (1) Canada & Germany 185 points (3) Russia 140

Mixed martial arts
UFC 140 in Toronto, Ontario, Canada:
Featherweight bout: Jung Chan-Sung  def. Mark Hominick  via KO (punches)
Welterweight bout: Brian Ebersole  def. Claude Patrick  via split decision (29–28, 28–29, 29–28)
Light Heavyweight bout: Antônio Rogério Nogueira  def. Tito Ortiz  via TKO (strikes to the body)
Heavyweight bout: Frank Mir  def. Antônio Rodrigo Nogueira  via submission (kimura)
Light Heavyweight Championship bout: Jon Jones  (c) def. Lyoto Machida  via technical submission (guillotine choke)

Nine-ball pool
Mosconi Cup in Las Vegas, United States:
Team Europe  10–5  Team USA
Darren Appleton /Niels Feijen  6–3 Shawn Putnam /Mike Dechaine 
Appleton 6–2 Putnam
Ralf Souquet /Feijen 6–2 Johnny Archer /Rodney Morris 
Nick van den Berg  5–6 Shane Van Boening 
Chris Melling  6–2 Dechaine

Nordic combined
World Cup in Ramsau, Austria:
HS 98 / 10 km:  Jan Schmid  22:05.8  Jason Lamy-Chappuis  22:08.2  Tino Edelmann  22:08.8
Standings (after 5 of 23 races): (1) Edelmann 300 points (2) Lamy-Chappuis 254 (3) Håvard Klemetsen  239

Rugby union
IRB Sevens World Series:
South Africa Sevens in Port Elizabeth:
Shield:  19–12 
Bowl:  19–22 
Plate:  48–0 
Cup:  26–31 
Standings (after 3 of 9 competitions): (1) Fiji & New Zealand 51 points (3) South Africa 48
Heineken Cup pool stage Matchday 3:
Pool 1:
Scarlets  14–17  Munster
Castres  41–22  Northampton Saints
Standings (after 3 matches): Munster 12 points, Scarlets 10, Castres 6, Northampton Saints 3.
Pool 2: Racing Métro  14–34  London Irish
Standings (after 3 matches):  Cardiff Blues 12 points,  Edinburgh 9, London Irish 7, Racing Métro 3.
Pool 5:
Benetton Treviso  30–26  Biarritz
Saracens  31–26  Ospreys
Standings (after 3 matches): Saracens 10 points, Ospreys, Biarritz 7, Benetton Treviso 6.
Pool 6: Connacht  10–14  Gloucester
Standings (after 3 matches):  Toulouse 12 points,  Harlequins 8, Gloucester 5, Connacht 1.
Amlin Challenge Cup pool stage Matchday 3:
Pool 1: Crociati Parma  0–57  Stade Français
Standings: Stade Français 14 points (3 matches),  Worcester Warriors,  București Wolves 5 (2), Crociati Parma 0 (3).
Pool 2: Lyon  31–16  Petrarca Padova
Standings (after 3 matches):  Newcastle Falcons 13 points,  Toulon 10, Lyon 5, Petrarca Padova 0.
Pool 3:
Rovigo  7–31  Bordeaux Bègles
Bayonne  19–11  London Wasps
Standings (after 3 matches): Bayonne 13 points, London Wasps 10, Bordeaux Bègles 5, Rovigo 0.
Pool 5: La Vila  18–47  Brive
Standings (after 3 matches): Brive 13 points,  Sale Sharks 10,  Agen 5, La Vila 0.

Short track speed skating
World Cup 4 in Shanghai, China (CHN unless stated):
500m men:  Olivier Jean  41.073  Gong Qiuwen 41.516  Daan Breeuwsma  41.667
Standings (after 5 of 8 races): (1) Jean 3000 points (2) Liang Wenhao 2164 (3) Jon Eley  1919
1500m men:  Noh Jin-Kyu  2:09.041 (WR)  Charles Hamelin  2:09.098  Kwak Yoon-Gy  2:09.548
Standings (after 5 of 8 races): (1) Noh 4000 points (2) Kwak 2240 (3) Hamelin 1826
500m women:  Fan Kexin 43.873  Liu Qiuhong 43.959  Jessica Smith  45.338
Standings (after 5 of 8 races): (1) Martina Valcepina  3302 points (2) Liu 2494 (3) Fan 2050
1500m women:  Cho Ha-Ri  2:22.473  Katherine Reutter  2:22.764  Xiao Han 2:23.061
Standings (after 5 of 8 races): (1) Cho 2952 points (2) Reutter 2800 (3) Lee Eun-Byul  2537

Skeleton
World Cup in La Plagne, France:
Women:  Mellisa Hollingsworth  2:06.09 (1:03.00, 1:03.09)  Anne O'Shea  2:06.46 (1:03.27, 1:03.19)  Katie Uhlaender  2:06.64 (1:03.43, 1:03.21)
Standings (after 2 of 8 races): (1) Hollingsworth 425 points (2) Olga Potylitsina  393 (3) Anja Huber  384

Ski jumping
Men's World Cup in Harrachov, Czech Republic:
HS 142 Team:   (Tom Hilde, Bjørn Einar Romøren, Vegard Sklett, Anders Bardal) 993.7 points   (Thomas Morgenstern, David Zauner, Andreas Kofler, Gregor Schlierenzauer) 956.0   (Jernej Damjan, Jure Šinkovec, Peter Prevc, Robert Kranjec) 888.6

Snooker
UK Championship in York, England, Semi-finals: Ricky Walden  7–9 Mark Allen

Surfing
Men's World Tour:
Billabong Pipeline Masters in Pipeline, Hawaii, United States: (1) Kieren Perrow  (2) Joel Parkinson  (3) Michel Bourez  & Kelly Slater 
Final Standings: (1) Slater 67,100 points (2) Parkinson 56,100 (3) Owen Wright  47,900

Swimming
European Short Course Championships in Szczecin, Poland:
100m freestyle men:  Sergey Fesikov  46.56  Luca Dotto  46.89  Krisztián Takács  47.46
1500m freestyle men:  Mateusz Sawrymowicz  14:29.81  Mads Glæsner  14:29.88  Sergiy Frolov  14:35.22
50m breaststroke men:  Fabio Scozzoli  26.25  Damir Dugonjič  26.34  Alexander Dale Oen  26.49
200m butterfly men:  László Cseh  1:50.87  Nikolay Skvortsov  1:51.21  Joe Roebuck  1:51.62
400m freestyle women:  Mireia Belmonte García  3:56.39  Lotte Friis  3:58.02  Melanie Costa Schmid  4:00.30
50m backstroke women:  Anastasia Zuyeva  26.23  Georgia Davies  26.93  Simona Baumrtová  26.94
100m individual medley women:  Theresa Michalak  59.05  Zsuzsanna Jakabos  59.72  Mie Østergaard Nielsen  1:00.10
4 × 50 m medley relay women:   (Nielsen, Rikke Møller Pedersen, Jeanette Ottesen, Pernille Blume) 1:46.48   (Zuyeva, Valentina Artemyeva, Irina Bespalova, Margarita Nesterova) 1:47.08   (Aleksandra Urbańczyk, Ewa Ścieszko, Anna Dowgiert, Katarzyna Wilk) 1:48.70

December 9, 2011 (Friday)

Biathlon
World Cup 2 in Hochfilzen, Austria:
10 km Sprint Men (all 0+0):  Carl Johan Bergman  24:41.9  Andrei Makoveev  24:51.1  Benjamin Weger  25:01.5
Sprint standings (after 2 of 10 races): (1) Bergman 120 points (2) Tarjei Bø  92 (3) Emil Hegle Svendsen  91
Overall standings (after 4 of 26 races): (1) Martin Fourcade  & Bergman 182 points (3) Svendsen 165
7.5 km Sprint Women:  Magdalena Neuner  21:09.2 (0+0)  Kaisa Mäkäräinen  21:24.1 (1+0)  Olga Zaitseva  21:31.9 (1+0)
Sprint standings (after 2 of 10 races): (1) Neuner 120 points (2) Mäkäräinen 102 (3) Darya Domracheva  80
Overall standings (after 4 of 26 races): (1) Neuner 216 points (2) Mäkäräinen 199 (3) Domracheva 165

Bobsleigh
World Cup in La Plagne, France:
Two-woman:  Kaillie Humphries/Emily Baadsvik  2:02.81 (1:01.63, 1:01.18)  Cathleen Martini/Janine Tischer  2:02.93 (1:01.79, 1:01.14)  Fabienne Meyer/Hanne Schenk  2:02.98 (1:01.75, 1:01.23)
Standings (after 2 of 8 races): (1) Anja Schneiderheinze-Stöckel  417 points (2) Martini & Sandra Kiriasis  394

Cricket
Pakistan in Bangladesh:
1st Test in Chittagong, day 1:  135 (51.2 overs);  132/0 (38 overs). Pakistan trail by 3 runs with 10 wickets remaining in the 1st innings.
New Zealand in Australia:
2nd Test in Hobart, day 1:  150 (45.5 overs; James Pattinson 5/51);  12/1 (4.2 overs). Australia trail by 138 runs with 9 wickets remaining in the 1st innings.

Curling
European Championships in Moscow, Russia:
Men:
Semifinal:  5–2 
World Challenge Game 1:  10–4 
Bronze Medal Game:  6–9  
Women:
Semifinal:  2–10 
World Challenge Game 1:  7–4 
Bronze Medal Game:  7–13

Figure skating
ISU Grand Prix:
Grand Prix Final and Junior Grand Prix Final in Quebec City, Canada:
Junior pairs:  Sui Wenjing / Han Cong  160.43 points  Katherine Bobak / Ian Beharry  152.65  Britney Simpson / Matthew Blackmer  146.35
Sui and Han win the title for the second time.
Junior ladies (all RUS):  Yulia Lipnitskaya 179.73 points  Polina Shelepen 162.34  Polina Korobeynikova 151.18
Lipnitskaia wins the title for the first time.

Freestyle skiing
World Cup in Copper Mountain, United States (USA unless stated):
Halfpipe men:  Wing Tai Barrymore 87.2 points  Torin Yater-Wallace 84.6  Duncan Adams 83.8
Halfpipe women:  Brita Sigourney 86.6 points  Rosalind Groenewoud  81.4  Virginie Faivre  77.4

Handball
World Women's Championship in Brazil (teams in bold advance to the Round of 16):
Group A in Santos:
 25–22 
 28–27 
 15–23 
Final standings: Norway 8 points, Angola, Montenegro, Iceland 6, Germany 4, China 0.
Group B in Barueri:
 39–9 
 26–38 
 34–19 
Final standings: Russia 10 points, Spain 8, South Korea 6, Netherlands 4, Kazakhstan 2, Australia 0.
Group C in São Paulo:
 24–32 
 20–39 
 34–33 
Final standings: Brazil 10 points, France 8, Romania, Japan 5, Tunisia 2, Cuba 0.
Group D in São Bernardo do Campo:
 31–24 
 19–20 
 23–18 
Final standings: Denmark 10 points, Croatia 8, Sweden 6, Côte d'Ivoire 4, Uruguay 2, Argentina 0.

Luge
World Cup 2 in Whistler, Canada:
Men (all GER):  Felix Loch 1:36.480 (48.263, 48.217)  Johannes Ludwig 1:36.758 (48.406, 48.352)  David Möller 1:36.778 (48.361, 48.417)
Standings (after 2 of 9 races): (1) Loch 200 points (2) Möller 155 (3) Ludwig 145
Doubles:  Andreas Linger/Wolfgang Linger  1:22.644 (41.255, 41.389)  Peter Penz/Georg Fischler  1:22.888 (41.331, 41.557)  Christian Oberstolz/Patrick Gruber  1:22.943 (41.380, 41.563)
Standings (after 2 of 9 races): (1) Penz/Fischler 185 points (2) Linger/Linger 170 (3) Vladislav YuzhakovVladimir Makhnutin  127

Nine-ball pool
Mosconi Cup in Las Vegas, United States:
Team Europe  6–4  Team USA
Nick van den Berg /Niels Feijen  5–6 Shane Van Boening /Johnny Archer 
Ralf Souquet  1–6 Mike Dechaine 
Darren Appleton /Chris Melling  5–6 Shawn Putnam /Rodney Morris 
van den Berg 6–1 Archer
Souquet/Melling  6–2 Van Boening/Morris

Rugby union
Heineken Cup pool stage Matchday 3:
Pool 2: Cardiff Blues  25–8  Edinburgh
Standings: Cardiff Blues 12 points (3 matches), Edinburgh 9 (3),  Racing Métro 3 (2),  London Irish 2 (2).
Pool 4: Ulster  31–10  Aironi
Standings: Ulster 9 points (3 matches),  Leicester Tigers 8 (2),  Clermont 6 (2), Aironi 0 (3).
Pool 6: Harlequins  10–21  Toulouse
Standings: Toulouse 12 points (3 matches), Harlequins 8 (3),  Gloucester 1 (2),  Connacht 0 (2).
Amlin Challenge Cup pool stage Matchday 3:
Pool 4: Perpignan  54–20  Cavalieri Prato
Standings: Perpignan 9 points (3 matches),  Newport Gwent Dragons 9 (2),  Exeter Chiefs 6 (2), Cavalieri Prato 0 (3).

Skeleton
World Cup in La Plagne, France:
Men:  Martins Dukurs  2:01.25 (1:00.51, 1:00.74)  Tomass Dukurs  2:02.23 (1:01.01, 1:01.22)  Aleksandr Tretyakov  2:02.42 (1:01.09, 1:01.33)
Standings (after 2 of 8 races): (1) Martins Dukurs 450 points (2) Tomass Dukurs & Tretyakov 410

Ski jumping
Men's World Cup in Harrachov, Czech Republic:
HS 142:  Gregor Schlierenzauer  246.8 points  Daiki Ito  245.8  Anders Bardal  245.0
Standings (after 4 of 27 events): (1) Andreas Kofler  313 points (2) Schlierenzauer 270 (3) Richard Freitag  194

Snooker
UK Championship in York, England, Semi-finals: Judd Trump  9–7 Neil Robertson

Swimming
European Short Course Championships in Szczecin, Poland:
50m backstroke men:  Aschwin Wildeboer  23.43  Flori Lang  23.57  Pavel Sankovich  23.64
100m breaststroke men:  Alexander Dale Oen  57.05  Damir Dugonjič  57.29  Fabio Scozzoli  57.30
100m butterfly men:  Konrad Czerniak  49.62  Yevgeny Korotyshkin  49.88  François Heersbrandt  50.44
400m individual medley men:  László Cseh  4:01.68  Dávid Verrasztó  4:03.03  Gal Nevo  4:04.49
100m freestyle women:  Britta Steffen  51.94  Jeanette Ottesen  52.05  Amy Smith  52.77
800m freestyle women:  Lotte Friis  8:07.53  Erika Villaécija García  8:12.23  Melanie Costa Schmid  8:16.28
100m backstroke women:  Daryna Zevina  56.96  Anastasia Zuyeva  57.12  Mie Østergaard Nielsen  57.57
200m breaststroke women:  Rikke Møller Pedersen  2:19.55  Anastasia Chaun  2:20.84  Fanny Lecluyse  2:21.14
50m butterfly women:  Ottesen 24.92 (CR)  Triin Aljand  25.51  Sviatlana Khakhlova  25.96
4 × 50 m freestyle relay women:   (Steffen, Dorothea Brandt, Paulina Schmiedel, Daniela Schreiber) 1:37.29   (Nielsen, Pernille Blume, Katrine Holm Sørensen, Ottesen) 1:37.63   (Erika Ferraioli, Erica Buratto, Federica Pellegrini, Laura Letrari) 1:38.12

December 8, 2011 (Thursday)

Alpine skiing
Men's World Cup in Beaver Creek, United States:
Slalom:  Ivica Kostelić  1:50.20 (54.64, 55.56)  Cristian Deville  1:50.34 (54.64, 55.70)  Marcel Hirscher  1:50.68 (54.50, 56.18)
Overall standings (after 8 of 45 races): (1) Aksel Lund Svindal  334 points (2) Ted Ligety  309 (3) Hirscher 280

Basketball
Euroleague Regular Season Matchday 8 (teams in bold advance to Top 16):
Group A: Olympiacos  84–82  Caja Laboral
Standings:  Fenerbahçe Ülker,  Bennet Cantù 5–3, Caja Laboral, Olympiacos 4–4,  Gescrap Bizkaia,  SLUC Nancy 3–5.
Group B: Unicaja  79–90  Brose Baskets
Standings:  CSKA Moscow 8–0,  Panathinaikos 6–2, Brose Baskets, Unicaja 3–5,  Žalgiris Kaunas,  KK Zagreb 2–6.
Group C:
Spirou Basket  84–79  Partizan Mt:s Belgrade
Real Madrid  88–64  Maccabi Tel Aviv
Standings: Real Madrid 6–2,  Anadolu Efes, Maccabi Tel Aviv 5–3, Partizan Mt:s Belgrade 4–4,  EA7 Emporio Armani, Spirou Basket 2–6.
Group D:
Galatasaray Medical Park  63–67  Montepaschi Siena
FC Barcelona Regal  63–50  UNICS Kazan
Standings: FC Barcelona Regal 8–0, Montepaschi Siena 6–2, UNICS Kazan 5–3, Galatasaray Medical Park 3–5,  Union Olimpija Ljubljana,  Asseco Prokom Gdynia 1–7.

Cricket
West Indies in India:
4th ODI in Indore:  418/5 (50 overs; Virender Sehwag 219);  265 (49.2 overs). India win by 153 runs; lead 5-match series 3–1.
Sehwag hits the highest individual score in a One Day International, surpassing 200* set by teammate Sachin Tendulkar in 2010.

Curling
European Championships in Moscow, Russia:
Men:
Tiebreakers:
Round 1:
 2–8 
 4–7 
Round 2:  5–7 
Playoffs:
 5–4 
 8–9 
Women:
Tiebreaker:  6–5 
Playoffs:
 12–6 
 9–6

Field hockey
Men's Champions Trophy in Auckland, New Zealand:
Pool C (team in bold advances to the final):
 3–2 
 2–4 
Standings (after 2 matches): Australia 6 points, Spain 3, New Zealand, Netherlands 1.
Pool D:
 6–2 
 1–2 
Standings (after 2 matches): Germany 4 points, Pakistan, Great Britain 3, Korea 1.

Football (soccer)
FIFA Club World Cup in Japan:
Play-off for Quarter-finals in Toyota: Kashiwa Reysol  2–0  Auckland City
Copa Sudamericana Finals first leg: LDU Quito  0–1  Universidad de Chile
 Primera División de México Apertura Liguilla Final First leg: Santos Laguna 0–1 Tigres UANL

Handball
World Women's Championship in Brazil (teams in bold advance to the Round of 16):
Group C in São Paulo:
 32–31 
 38–18 
 33–28 
Standings (after 4 matches): Brazil 8 points, France 6, Romania 5, Japan 3, Tunisia 2, Cuba 0.
Group D in São Bernardo do Campo:
 27–26 
 38–17 
 19–16 
Standings (after 4 matches): Denmark 8 points, Croatia, Sweden 6, Côte d'Ivoire, Uruguay 2, Argentina 0.

Nine-ball pool
Mosconi Cup in Las Vegas, United States:
Team Europe  4–1  Team USA
Team Europe 6–4 Team USA  
Chris Melling /Nick van den Berg  3–6 Johnny Archer /Shawn Putnam 
Niels Feijen  6–0 Rodney Morris 
Darren Appleton /Ralf Souquet  6–4 Shane Van Boening /Mike Dechaine 
Melling 6–5 Van Boening

Rugby union
Amlin Challenge Cup pool stage Matchday 3:
Pool 2: Newcastle Falcons  6–3  Toulon
Standings: Newcastle Falcons 13 points (3 matches), Toulon 10 (3),  Lyon 1 (2),  Petrarca Padova 0 (2).
Pool 5: Agen  14–29  Sale Sharks
Standings: Sale Sharks 10 points (3 matches),  Brive 8 (2), Agen 5 (3),  La Vila 0 (2).

Snooker
UK Championship in York, England, quarter-finals:
Stephen Maguire  3–6 Judd Trump 
Ding Junhui  2–6 Neil Robertson 
Ricky Walden  6–3 Shaun Murphy 
Mark Allen  6–5 Marco Fu

Swimming
European Short Course Championships in Szczecin, Poland:
50m freestyle men:  Konrad Czerniak  20.88  Sergey Fesikov  20.95  Marco Orsi  21.01
400m freestyle men:  Paul Biedermann  3:38.65  Mads Glæsner  3:39.30  Paweł Korzeniowski  3:40.54
200m backstroke men:  Radosław Kawęcki  1:49.15  Aschwin Wildeboer  1:50.63  Péter Bernek  1:51.21
200m individual medley men:  László Cseh  1:53.43  Markus Rogan  1:53.63  Gal Nevo  1:54.87
4 × 50 m medley men:   (Mirco Di Tora, Fabio Scozzoli, Paolo Facchinelli, Orsi) 1:33.18   (Vitaly Borisov, Sergey Geybel, Yevgeny Korotyshkin, Fesikov) 1:33.86   (Christian Diener, Erik Steinhagen, Steffen Deibler, Stefan Herbst) 1:34.41
50m breaststroke women:  Valentina Artemyeva  30.06  Dorothea Brandt  30.17  Daria Deeva  30.63
200m butterfly women:  Mireia Belmonte García  2:03.37  Jemma Lowe  2:04.04  Jessica Dickons  2:04.80
200m individual medley women:  Belmonte García 2:07.06  Evelyn Verrasztó  2:08.28  Hannah Miley  2:08.34

December 7, 2011 (Wednesday)

Alpine skiing
Women's World Cup in Beaver Creek, United States:
Super Giant Slalom:  Lindsey Vonn  1:10.68  Fabienne Suter  1:11.05  Anna Fenninger  1:11.09
Super-G standings (after 2 of 7 races): (1) Vonn 200 points (2) Fenninger 140 (3) Suter 94
Overall standings (after 7 of 40 races): (1) Vonn 522 points (2) Viktoria Rebensburg  286 (3) Elisabeth Görgl  269

Basketball
Euroleague Regular Season Matchday 8 (teams in bold advance to Top 16):
Group A:
Gescrap Bizkaia  64–67  Bennet Cantù
SLUC Nancy  53–73  Fenerbahçe Ülker
Standings: Fenerbahçe Ülker, Bennet Cantù 5–3,  Caja Laboral 4–3,  Olympiacos 3–4, Gescrap Bizkaia, SLUC Nancy 3–5.
Group B:
CSKA Moscow  87–74  KK Zagreb
Žalgiris Kaunas  59–94  Panathinaikos
Standings: CSKA Moscow 8–0, Panathinaikos 6–2,  Unicaja 3–4,  Brose Baskets 2–5, Žalgiris Kaunas, KK Zagreb 2–6.
Group C: Anadolu Efes  84–70  EA7 Emporio Armani
Standings:  Real Madrid,  Maccabi Tel Aviv 5–2, Anadolu Efes 5–3,  Partizan Mt:s Belgrade 4–3, EA7 Emporio Armani 2–6,  Spirou Charleroi 1–6.
Group D: Asseco Prokom Gdynia  67–52  Union Olimpija Ljubljana
Standings:  FC Barcelona Regal 7–0,  Montepaschi Siena,  UNICS Kazan 5–2,  Galatasaray Medical Park 3–4, Union Olimpija Ljubljana, Asseco Prokom Gdynia 1–7.

Curling
European Championships in Moscow, Russia (teams in bold advance to the playoffs; teams in italics advance to tiebreaker):
Men:
Draw 8:
 4–6 
 6–4 
 9–4 
 7–9 
 6–7 
Draw 9:
 7–6 
 3–4 
 10–6 
 4–6 
 9–3 
Final standings: Sweden, Norway, Denmark 6–3, Switzerland, Czech Republic, Germany, Scotland 5–4, France 4–5, Latvia 2–7, Italy 1–8.
Women:
Draw 8:
 6–5 
 5–9 
 8–4 
 3–5 
 6–9 
Draw 9:
 4–7 
 7–10 
 4–6 
 2–14 
 8–4 
Final standings: Sweden 9–0, Denmark 8–1, Scotland 7–2, Russia, Germany 5–4, Italy, Switzerland, Czech Republic 3–6, Latvia, Norway 1–8.

Football (soccer)
CAF U-23 Championship in Marrakech, Morocco (winner qualifies for 2012 Olympics):
Semi-finals:  2–3 
UEFA Champions League group stage, Matchday 6 (teams in bold qualify for Round of 16, teams in italics qualify for Europa League Round of 32):
Group A:
Manchester City  2–0  Bayern Munich
Villarreal  0–2  Napoli
Final standings: Bayern Munich 13 points, Napoli 11, Manchester City 10, Villarreal 0.
Group B:
Lille  0–0  Trabzonspor
Internazionale  1–2  CSKA Moscow
Final standings: Internazionale 10 points, CSKA Moscow 8, Trabzonspor 7, Lille 6.
Group C:
Basel  2–1  Manchester United
Benfica  1–0  Oțelul Galați
Final standings: Benfica 12 points, Basel 11, Manchester United 9, Oțelul Galați 0.
Group D:
Dinamo Zagreb  1–7  Lyon
Ajax  0–3  Real Madrid
Final standings: Real Madrid 18 points, Lyon, Ajax 8, Dinamo Zagreb 0.

Handball
World Women's Championship in Brazil (teams in bold advance to the Round of 16):
Group A in Santos:
 42–15 
 20–26 
 26–20 
Standings (after 4 matches): Montenegro, Norway 6 points, Angola, Iceland, Germany 4, China 0.
Group B in Barueri:
 26–35 
 18–27 
 11–45 
Standings (after 4 matches): Russia 8 points, Spain 6, Netherlands, South Korea 4, Kazakhstan 2, Australia 0.

Snooker
UK Championship in York, England, last 16 (ENG unless stated):
Mark Williams  3–6 Ricky Walden
Martin Gould 4–6 Shaun Murphy
Ali Carter 2–6 Mark Allen 
Marco Fu  6–3 Mark Selby

December 6, 2011 (Tuesday)

Alpine skiing
Men's World Cup in Beaver Creek, United States:
Giant slalom:  Ted Ligety  2:40.01 (1:20.42, 1:19.59)  Marcel Hirscher  2:40.70 (1:20.39, 1:20.31)  Kjetil Jansrud  2:40.79 (1:20.78, 1:20.01)
Giant slalom standings (after 3 of 9 races): (1) Ligety 280 points (2) Hirscher 220 (3) Alexis Pinturault  159
Overall standings (after 7 of 45 races): (1) Aksel Lund Svindal  334 points (2) Ligety 289 (3) Didier Cuche  268

Cricket
Pakistan in Bangladesh:
3rd ODI in Chittagong:  177 (46.1 overs);  119 (38 overs). Pakistan win by 58 runs; win 3-match series 3–0.

Curling
European Championships in Moscow, Russia (teams in bold advance to the playoffs):
Men:
Draw 6:
 2–5 
 2–5 
 7–8 
 7–4 
 5–4 
Draw 7:
 9–8 
 4–8 
 8–6 
 9–4 
 7–2 
Standings (after 7 draws): Denmark, Sweden 6–1, Germany, Norway, Scotland 4–3, Czech Republic, Switzerland 3–4, France, Latvia 2–5, Italy 1–6.
Women:
Draw 7:
 3–8 
 11–1 
 4–11 
 4–7 
 8–4 
Standings (after 7 draws): Sweden 7–0, Denmark 6–1, Scotland 5–2, Germany, Russia 4–3, Switzerland 3–4, Czech Republic, Italy 2–5, Latvia, Norway 1–6.

Field hockey
Men's Champions Trophy in Auckland, New Zealand (teams in bold advance to the top four):
Pool A:
 8–1 
 6–1 
Final standings: Australia 9 points, Spain 6, Great Britain 3, Pakistan 0.
Pool B:
 3–3 
 3–3 
Final standings: Netherlands 7 points, New Zealand, Germany 4, Korea 1.

Football (soccer)
CAF U-23 Championship in Tangiers, Morocco (winner qualifies for 2012 Olympics):
Semi-finals:  0–1 (a.e.t.) 
UEFA Champions League group stage, Matchday 6 (teams in bold qualify for Round of 16, teams in italics qualify for Europa League Round of 32):
Group E:
Chelsea  3–0  Valencia
Genk  1–1  Bayer Leverkusen
Final standings: Chelsea 11 points, Bayer Leverkusen 10, Valencia 8, Genk 3.
Group F:
Olympiacos  3–1  Arsenal
Borussia Dortmund  2–3  Marseille
Final standings: Arsenal 11 points, Marseille 10, Olympiacos 9, Borussia Dortmund 4.
Group G:
Porto  0–0  Zenit St. Petersburg
APOEL  0–2  Shakhtar Donetsk
Final standings: APOEL, Zenit St. Petersburg 9 points, Porto 8, Shakhtar Donetsk 5.
Group H:
Barcelona  4–0  BATE Borisov
Viktoria Plzeň  2–2  Milan
Final standings: Barcelona 16 points, Milan 9, Viktoria Plzeň 5, BATE Borisov 2.

Handball
World Women's Championship in Brazil (teams in bold advance to the Round of 16):
Group A in Santos:
 28–26 
 27–14 
 23–22 
Standings (after 3 matches): Norway, Montenegro, Angola, Germany 4 points, Iceland 2, China 0.
Group B in Barueri:
 45–8 
 20–32 
 26–29 
Standings (after 3 matches): Russia 6 points, Spain, Netherlands 4, South Korea, Kazakhstan 2, Australia 0.
Group C in São Paulo:
 32–29 
 28–28 
 22–26 
Standings (after 3 matches): Brazil 6 points, Romania 5, France 4, Tunisia 2, Japan 1, Cuba 0.
Group D in São Bernardo do Campo:
 31–14 
 19–23 
 19–25 
Standings (after 3 matches): Denmark, Sweden 6 points, Croatia 4, Côte d'Ivoire 2, Argentina, Uruguay 0.

Snooker
UK Championship in York, England, last 16:
Ronnie O'Sullivan  5–6 Judd Trump 
Ding Junhui  6–5 Matthew Stevens 
John Higgins  4–6 Stephen Maguire 
Graeme Dott  3–6 Neil Robertson

December 5, 2011 (Monday)

Cricket
West Indies in India:
3rd ODI in Ahmedabad:  260/5 (50 overs);  244 (46.5 overs). West Indies win by 16 runs; India lead 5-match series 2–1.

Curling
European Championships in Moscow, Russia:
Men:
Draw 4:
 4–9 
 7–6 
 7–4 
 7–8 
 5–6 
Draw 5:
 3–8 
 8–3 
 8–4 
 6–5 
 10–3 
Standings (after 5 draws): Denmark, Germany, Sweden 4–1, Norway, Scotland, Switzerland 3–2, Czech Republic 2–3, France, Latvia, 1–4, Italy 0–5.
Women:
Draw 5:
 5–7 
 2–10 
 6–5 
 7–13 
 5–4 
Draw 6:
 10–1 
 6–9 
 5–4 
 3–8 
 8–7 
Standings (after 6 draws): Sweden 6–0, Denmark 5–1, Russia, Scotland 4–2, Germany 3–3, Czech Republic, Italy, Switzerland 2–4, Latvia, Norway 1–5.

Field hockey
Men's Champions Trophy in Auckland, New Zealand: (teams in bold advance to the top four)
Pool A:
 1–4 
 4–2 
Standings (after 2 matches): Australia 6 points, Spain, Great Britain 3, Pakistan 0.
Pool B:
 3–2 
 1–6 
Standings (after 2 matches): Netherlands 6 points, New Zealand, Germany 3, Korea 0.

Handball
World Women's Championship in Brazil:
Group C in São Paulo:
 27–33 
 17–25 
 23–32 
Standings (after 2 matches): France, Brazil, Romania 4 points, Tunisia, Cuba, Japan 0.
Group D in São Bernardo do Campo:
 25–28 
 13–31 
 15–45 
Standings (after 2 matches): Croatia, Denmark, Sweden 4 points, Côte d'Ivoire, Argentina, Uruguay 0.

Snooker
UK Championship in York, England, last 32 (ENG unless stated):
Judd Trump 6–4 Dominic Dale 
Mark Allen  6–3 Adrian Gunnell
Stephen Lee 3–6 Ricky Walden
Mark Williams  6–4 Joe Jogia

December 4, 2011 (Sunday)

Alpine skiing
Men's World Cup in Beaver Creek, United States:
Giant slalom:  Marcel Hirscher  2:38.45 (1:18.74, 1:19.71)  Ted Ligety  2:38.61 (1:18.53, 1:20.08)  Fritz Dopfer  2:39.07 (1:19.12, 1:19.95)
Giant slalom standings (after 2 of 8 races): (1) Ligety 180 points (2) Hirscher 140 (3) Alexis Pinturault  109
Overall standings (after 6 of 45 races): (1) Aksel Lund Svindal  294 points (2) Didier Cuche  260 (3) Beat Feuz  246
Women's World Cup in Lake Louise, Canada:
Super-G:  Lindsey Vonn  1:20.21  Anna Fenninger  1:20.40  Julia Mancuso  1:20.92
Overall standings (after 6 of 40 races): (1) Vonn 422 points (2) Viktoria Rebensburg  286 (3) Elisabeth Görgl  243

American football
2011 NCAA Division I FBS football season:
The 2012 Bowl Championship Series pairings are announced:
Rose Bowl, Jan. 2: (10) Wisconsin vs. (5) Oregon
Fiesta Bowl, Jan. 2: (3) Oklahoma State vs. (4) Stanford
Sugar Bowl, Jan. 3: (13) Michigan vs. (11) Virginia Tech
Orange Bowl, Jan. 4: (15) Clemson vs. (23) West Virginia
BCS National Championship Game, Jan. 9: (1) LSU vs. (2) Alabama

Auto racing
V8 Supercars:
Sydney Telstra 500 in Sydney, New South Wales (AUS unless stated):
Race 28: (1) Mark Winterbottom (Ford Performance Racing; Ford FG Falcon) (2) Craig Lowndes (Triple Eight Race Engineering; Holden VE Commodore) (3) Shane van Gisbergen  (Stone Brothers Racing; Ford FG Falcon)
Final drivers' championship standings: (1) Jamie Whincup (Triple Eight Race Engineering; Holden VE Commodore) 3168 points (2) Lowndes 3133 (3) Winterbottom 2710
Whincup wins the title for the third time.

Biathlon
World Cup 1 in Östersund, Sweden:
Men's 12.5 km Pursuit:  Martin Fourcade  32:56.0 (0+0+0+0)  Emil Hegle Svendsen  33:21.5 (0+0+1+1)  Jaroslav Soukup  33:22.9 (0+1+0+0)
Overall standings (after 3 of 26 races): (1) Fourcade 163 points (2) Carl Johan Bergman  & Svendsen 122
Women's 10 km Pursuit:  Tora Berger  33:56.9 (0+0+0+1)  Kaisa Mäkäräinen  34:30.1 (0+1+0+1)  Magdalena Neuner  35:21.3 (0+1+2+1)
Overall standings (after 3 of 26 races): (1) Neuner 156 points (2) Mäkäräinen 145 (3) Berger 126

Bobsleigh
World Cup in Igls, Austria:
Four-man:   (Alexandr Zubkov, Filipp Yegorov, Dmitry Trunenkov, Nikolay Hrenkov) 1:43.05 (51.56, 51.49)   (Steven Holcomb, Justin Olsen, Steven Langton, Curtis Tomasevicz) 1:43.11 (51.65, 51.46)   (Thomas Florschütz, Martin Rostig, Kevin Kuske, Thomas Blaschek) 1:43.41 (51.77, 51.64)

Cricket
New Zealand in Australia:
1st Test in Woolloongabba, Brisbane, day 4:  295 & 150 (49.4 overs; James Pattinson 5/27);  427 & 19/1 (2.2 overs). Australia win by 9 wickets; lead 2-match series 1–0.

Cross-country skiing
World Cup in Düsseldorf, Germany:
Men's Team Sprint F:  Jesper Modin/Teodor Peterson  18:22.7  Nikita Kriukov/Alexei Petukhov  18:22.9  Pål Golberg/Ola Vigen Hattestad  18:23.4
Women's Team Sprint F:  Mari Eide/Maiken Caspersen Falla  9:57.0  Sadie Bjornsen/Kikkan Randall  9:58.6  Natalya Korostelyova/Natalya Matveyeva  9:59.1

Curling
European Championships in Moscow, Russia:
Men:
Draw 2:
 7–3 
 6–3 
 6–5 
 7–4 
 8–2 
Draw 3:
 10–6 
 4–7 
 8–3 
 8–11 
 5–9 
Standings (after 3 draws): Germany 3–0, Denmark, Norway, Scotland, Sweden 2–1, Czech Republic, France, Latvia, Switzerland 1–2, Italy 0–3.
Women:
Draw 3:
 9–7 
 8–3 
 11–4 
 11–2 
 5–8 
Draw 4:
 5–6 
 8–2 
 6–10 
 5–11 
 6–7 
Standings (after 4 draws): Sweden 4–0, Denmark, Germany, Russia 3–1, Italy, Scotland 2–2, Czech Republic, Latvia, Switzerland 1–3, Norway 0–4.

Field hockey
Men's Champions Trophy in Auckland, New Zealand: All matches postponed due to an unplayable pitch.

Football (soccer)
CAF Confederation Cup Final second leg (first leg score in parentheses): Maghreb de Fès  1–0 (0–1)  Club Africain. 1–1 on aggregate, Maghreb de Fès win 6–5 on penalties.
Magreb de Fès win the Cup for the first time.
 Campeonato Brasileiro Série A, final matchday:
Corinthians 0–0 Palmeiras
Vasco da Gama 1–1 Flamengo
Final standings: Corinthians 71 points, Vasco da Gama 69.
Corinthians win the title for the fifth time.
 Argentine Primera División Torneo Apertura, matchday 17:
Boca Juniors 3–0 Banfield
Standings (after 17 matches): Boca Juniors 39 points, Racing 28, Tigre 27 (16).
Boca Juniors win the title for the 24th time.
 Uruguayan Primera División Torneo Apertura, final matchday:
Liverpool 0–1 Nacional
Danubio 4–1 Bella Vista
Final standings: Nacional 32 points, Danubio 31.
Nacional qualify for the championship playoff.

Golf
European Tour:
UBS Hong Kong Open in Sheung Shui, Hong Kong:
Winner: Rory McIlroy  268 (−12)
McIlroy wins his third European Tour title.
Chevron World Challenge in Thousand Oaks, California, United States:
Winner: Tiger Woods  278 (−10)
Woods wins his first tournament in over two years.

Handball
World Women's Championship in Brazil:
Group A in Santos:
 24–25 
 16–43 
 24–28 
Standings (after 2 matches): Angola 4 points, Norway, Germany, Montenegro, Iceland 2, China 0.
Group B in Barueri:
 31–19 
 22–28 
 15–33 
Standings (after 2 matches): Russia 4 points, Netherlands, Kazakhstan, Spain, South Korea 2, Australia 0.

Nordic combined
World Cup in Lillehammer, Norway:
HS 138 / 10 km:  Eric Frenzel  28:38.5  Jason Lamy-Chappuis  28:55.9  Björn Kircheisen  28:59.1
Standings (after 4 of 23 races): (1) Tino Edelmann  240 points (2) Håvard Klemetsen  189 (3) Alessandro Pittin  180

Short track speed skating
World Cup 3 in Nagoya, Japan (CHN unless stated):
Men's 500m:  Olivier Jean  41.491  Liang Wenhao 41.738  Gong Qiuwen 42.815
Standings (after 4 of 8 races): (1) Jean 2000 points (2) Jon Eley  1875 (3) Liang 1652
Men's 1000m (2):  Charles Hamelin  1:28.270  Kwak Yoon-Gy  1:28.365  Michael Gilday  1:28.939
Standings (after 4 of 8 races): (1) Kwak 3312 points (2) Hamelin 2000 (3) Noh Jin-Kyu  1456
Men's 5000m relay:   (Liang, Song Weilong, Wu Dajing, Yu Yongjun) 6:50.562   (Semen Elistratov, Evgeny Kozulin, Viacheslav Kurginian, Vladimir Grigorev) 6:53.481   (Yuzo Takamido, Yuma Sakurai, Daisuke Uemura, Yoshiaki Oguro) 6:53.557
Standings (after 3 of 6 races): (1)  2152 points (2) Russia 2010 (3)  1850
Women's 500m:  Arianna Fontana  44.479  Yui Sakai  44.566  Martina Valcepina  44.667
Standings (after 4 of 8 races): (1) Valcepina 3040 points (2) Fontana & Marianne St-Gelais  2000
Women's 1000m (2):  Li Jianrou 1:32.708  Lin Meng 1:33.226  Xiao Han 1:33.334
Standings (after 4 of 8 races): (1) Sakai 2410 points (2) Elise Christie  2096 (3) Li 1162
Women's 3000m relay:   (Fontana, Cecilia Maffei, Arianna Valcepina, Martina Valcepina) 4:19.970   (Ayuko Ito, Sayuri Shimizu, Sakai, Marie Yoshida) 4:20.041   (Liu Qiuhong, Fan Kexin, Lin, Xiao) 4:20.122
Standings (after 3 of 6 races): (1) China 2640 points (2) Japan 1768 (3)  1620

Ski jumping
Men's World Cup in Lillehammer, Norway:
HS 138:  Andreas Kofler  252.0 points  Severin Freund  249.2  Anders Bardal  249.2
Standings (after 3 of 27 events): (1) Kofler 300 points (2) Gregor Schlierenzauer  170 (3) Richard Freitag  154

Snooker
UK Championship in York, England, last 32 (ENG unless stated):
Mark Selby 6–0 Ryan Day 
Stuart Bingham 4–6 Marco Fu 
Ronnie O'Sullivan 6–1 Steve Davis
Ali Carter 6–4 Robert Milkins
Martin Gould 6–2 Peter Lines
Shaun Murphy 6–3 Li Yan

Speed skating
World Cup 3 in Heerenveen, Netherlands (NED unless stated):
Men's 1000 m:  Kjeld Nuis 1:08.64,  Sjoerd de Vries 1:09.14,  Mo Tae-bum  1:09.18
Standings (after 3 of 6 races): (1) Nuis & Stefan Groothuis 260 points, (3) de Vries 180
Men's team pursuit:   (Sven Kramer, Wouter olde Heuvel, Jan Blokhuijsen) 3:42.35,   (Lee Seung-hoon, Joo Hyong-jun, Ko Byung-wook) 3:43.82,   (Patrick Beckert, Marco Weber, Alexej Baumgärtner) 3:45.28
Standings (after 2 of 4 races): (1) Netherlands 200 points, (2) Korea & Germany 140
Women's 1000 m:  Christine Nesbitt  1:15.32,  Yu Jing  1:15.85,  Yekaterina Shikhova  1:16.16
Standings (after 3 of 6 races): (1) Nesbitt 300 points, (2) Marrit Leenstra 180, (3) Margot Boer 166
Women's team pursuit:   (Brittany Schussler, Nesbitt, Cindy Klassen) 3:00.01,   (Yekaterina Lobysheva, Shikhova, Yuliya Skokova) 3:02.38,   (Lee Ju-yeon, Noh Seon-yeong, Kim Bo-reum) 3:03.18
Standings (after 2 of 4 races): (1) Canada 200 points, (2) Russia 150, (3) Korea 130

Tennis
Davis Cup Final, day 3:  3–1 
Rafael Nadal  def. Juan Martín del Potro  1–6, 6–4, 6–1, 7–6(0)
David Ferrer  vs. Juan Mónaco ; not played
Spain win the Cup for the fifth time.

Volleyball
FIVB Men's World Cup in Japan, Matchday 11 (teams in bold qualify for the 2012 Olympics):
 2–3 
 1–3 
 0–3 
 3–1 
 3–0 
 3–0 
Final standings: Russia 29 points, Poland 26, Brazil, Italy 24, Cuba 20, United States, Argentina 16, Serbia 15, Iran 12, Japan 8, China 5, Egypt 3.
Russia win the title for the sixth time.

December 3, 2011 (Saturday)

Alpine skiing
Men's World Cup in Beaver Creek, United States:
Super-G:  Sandro Viletta  1:18.71  Aksel Lund Svindal  1:18.91  Beat Feuz  1:18.97
Super-G standings (after 2 of 8 races): (1) Svindal 180 points (2) Didier Cuche  109 (3) Viletta 108
Overall standings (after 5 of 45 races): (1) Svindal 265 points (2) Cuche 238 (3) Feuz 231
Women's World Cup in Lake Louise, Canada:
Downhill:  Lindsey Vonn  1:51.35  Marie Marchand-Arvier  1:53.03  Elisabeth Görgl  1:53.26
Downhill standings (after 2 of 9 races): (1) Vonn 200 points (2) Tina Weirather  106 (3) Dominique Gisin  105
Overall standings (after 5 of 40 races): (1) Vonn 322 points (2) Viktoria Rebensburg  280 (3) Görgl 211

American football
NCAA Football Bowl Subdivision Championship Games:
Conference USA in Houston: (24) Southern Miss 49, (7) Houston 28
SEC in Atlanta: (1) LSU 41, (12) Georgia 10
The Tigers advance to the BCS National Championship Game.
ACC in Charlotte, North Carolina: (21) Clemson 38, (5) Virginia Tech 10
Clemson will play in the Orange Bowl.
Big Ten in Indianapolis: (15) Wisconsin 42, (11) Michigan State 39
The Badgers will play Oregon in the Rose Bowl.
Bedlam Series: (3) Oklahoma State 44, (13) Oklahoma 10
Oklahoma State advances to the Fiesta Bowl or BCS National Championship Game.

Auto racing
V8 Supercars:
Sydney Telstra 500 in Sydney, New South Wales (AUS unless stated):
Race 27: (1) Craig Lowndes (Triple Eight Race Engineering; Holden VE Commodore) (2) Garth Tander (Holden Racing Team; Holden VE Commodore) (3) Shane van Gisbergen  (Stone Brothers Racing; Ford FG Falcon)
Drivers' championship standings: (1) Jamie Whincup (Triple Eight Race Engineering; Holden VE Commodore) 3078 points (2) Lowndes 2995 (3) Mark Winterbottom (Ford Performance Racing; Ford FG Falcon) 2560

Biathlon
World Cup 1 in Östersund, Sweden:
Women's 7.5 km Sprint:  Magdalena Neuner  22:01.7 (0+1)  Tora Berger  22:01.9 (0+1)  Kaisa Mäkäräinen  22:16.9 (2+0)
Overall standings (after 2 of 26 races): (1) Neuner 108 points (2) Darya Domracheva  100 (3) Mäkäräinen 91

Bobsleigh
World Cup in Igls, Austria:
Two-man:  Beat Hefti/Thomas Lamparter  1:44.24 (52.20, 52.04)  Thomas Florschütz/Kevin Kuske  1:44.36 (52.33, 52.03)  Steven Holcomb/Justin Olsen  1:44.42 (52.26, 52.16)
Team:   I (Frank Rommel, Sandra Kiriasis/Stephanie Schneider, Anja Huber, Maximilian Arndt/Jan Speer) 3:35.03 (53.28, 53.84, 55.12, 52.79)   II (Alexander Kröckel, Anja Schneiderheinze-Stöckel/Christin Senkel, Marion Thees, Manuel Machata/Michail Makarow) 3:35.13 (53.40, 53.70, 55.32, 52.71)   I (Aleksandr Tretyakov, Olga Fyodorova/Yulia Timofeeva, Olga Potylitsina, Alexander Kasjanov/Maxim Mokrousov) 3:35.29 (53.37, 54.10, 54.94, 52.88)

Cricket
New Zealand in Australia:
1st Test in Woolloongabba, Brisbane, day 3:  295 & 10/1 (7 overs);  427 (129.2 overs; Michael Clarke 139). New Zealand trail by 122 runs with 9 wickets remaining.
Pakistan in Bangladesh:
2nd ODI in Mirpur:  262/7 (50 overs);  186/7 (50 overs; Nasir Hossain 100). Pakistan win by 76 runs; lead 3-match series 2–0.

Cross-country skiing
World Cup in Düsseldorf, Germany (NOR unless stated):
Men's Sprint F:  Ola Vigen Hattestad 2:57.5  Alexei Petukhov  2:57.6  Pål Golberg 2:57.6
Sprint standings (after 2 of 13 races): (1) Hattestad 111 points (2) Petukhov 108 (3) Teodor Peterson  95
Overall standings (after 6 of 38 races): (1) Petter Northug 355 points (2) Dario Cologna  278 (3) Johan Olsson  259
Women's Sprint F:  Kikkan Randall  1:44.7  Natalya Matveyeva  1:45.1  Laurien van der Graaf  1:45.7
Sprint standings (after 2 of 13 races): (1) Randall 140 points (2) Matveyeva 114 (3) Hanna Brodin  71
Overall standings (after 6 of 38 races): (1) Marit Bjørgen 446 points (2) Therese Johaug 316 (3) Vibeke Skofterud 309

Curling
European Championships in Moscow, Russia:
Men, Draw 1:
 7–3 
 5–7 
 8–5 
 3–11 
 4–6 
Women:
Draw 1:
 8–6 
 8–4 
 6–9 
 7–5 
 10–12 
Draw 2:
 7–5 
 2–12 
 5–7 
 12–0 
 6–8 
Standings (after 2 draws): Sweden, Germany 2–0, Scotland, Czech Republic, Italy, Russia, Denmark, Latvia 1–1, Norway, Switzerland 0–2.

Field hockey
Men's Champions Trophy in Auckland, New Zealand:
Pool A:
 3–2 
 2–1 
Pool B:
 2–1 
 2–0

Football (soccer)
CAF U-23 Championship in Morocco (teams in bold qualify for the semifinals):
Group B:
 2–0 
 3–1 
Final standings: Egypt 6 points, Gabon, Côte d'Ivoire 4, South Africa 2.
OFC Champions League group stage Matchday 3:
Group A: Mont-Dore  0–1  Waitakere United
Standings (after 3 matches): Waitakere United 9 points,  Tefana 4,  Ba 3, Mont-Dore 1.
 J.League Division 1, final matchday (teams in bold qualify for the AFC Champions League):
Urawa Red Diamonds 1–3 Kashiwa Reysol
Albirex Niigata 0–1 Nagoya Grampus
Shimizu S-Pulse 1–3 Gamba Osaka
Standings: Kashiwa Reysol 72 points, Nagoya Grampus 71, Gamba Osaka 70.
Kashiwa Reysol win the title for the first time, and will represent Japan at the FIFA Club World Cup.

Handball
World Women's Championship in Brazil:
Group A in Santos:
 21–22 
 28–31 
 30–29 
Group B in Barueri:
 37–9 
 39–24 
 27–34 
Group C in São Paulo:
 30–28 
 41–22 
Group D in São Bernardo do Campo:
 37–11 
 36–10 
 36–20

Nordic combined
World Cup in Lillehammer, Norway:
HS 100 / 10 km:  Håvard Klemetsen  27:44.4  Alessandro Pittin  27:44.6  Tino Edelmann  27:53.0
Standings (after 3 of 23 races): (1) Edelmann 220 points (2) Magnus Krog  169 (3) Klemetsen 165

Rugby union
IRB Sevens World Series:
Dubai Sevens in Dubai, United Arab Emirates:
Shield:  31–17 
Bowl:  0–26 
Plate:  17–14 
Cup:  29–12 
Standings (after 2 of 9 competitions): (1)  39 points (2) England 32 (3) France,  & South Africa 29
End of year tests in Cardiff:  18–24

Short track speed skating
World Cup 3 in Nagoya, Japan (KOR unless stated):
Men's 1000m (1): Kwak Yoon-Gy 1:29.743  J. R. Celski  1:29.828  Seo Yi-Ra 1:29.899
Standings (after 3 of 8 races): (1) Kwak 2512 points (2) Celski 1312 (3) Olivier Jean  1152
Men's 1500m:  Noh Jin-Kyu 2:14.941  Lee Ho-Suk 2:15.127  Charle Cournoyer  2:15.392
Standings (after 4 of 8 races): (1) Noh 3000 points (2) Lee & Kwak 1600
Women's 1000m (1):  Yui Sakai  1:32.713  Elise Christie  1:32.786  Katherine Reutter  1:32.945
Standings (after 3 of 8 races): (1) Sakai 2410 points (2) Christie 1928 (3) Marianne St-Gelais  1035
Women's 1500m:  Arianna Fontana  2:24.329  Cho Ha-Ri 2:24.423  Lana Gehring  2:24.721
Standings (after 4 of 8 races): (1) Lee Eun-Byul 2502 points (2) Fontana 2262 (3) Reutter 2000

Skeleton
World Cup in Igls, Austria:
Men:  Martins Dukurs  1:45.64 (52.69, 52.95)  Aleksandr Tretyakov  1:46.74 (53.25, 53.49)  Tomass Dukurs  1:46.77 (53.22, 53.55)
Team:   I (Frank Rommel, Sandra Kiriasis/Stephanie Schneider, Anja Huber, Maximilian Arndt/Jan Speer) 3:35.03 (53.28, 53.84, 55.12, 52.79)   II (Alexander Kröckel, Anja Schneiderheinze-Stöckel/Christin Senkel, Marion Thees, Manuel Machata/Michail Makarow) 3:35.13 (53.40, 53.70, 55.32, 52.71)   I (Tretyakov, Olga Fyodorova/Yulia Timofeeva, Olga Potylitsina, Alexander Kasjanov/Maxim Mokrousov) 3:35.29 (53.37, 54.10, 54.94, 52.88)

Ski jumping
World Cup in Lillehammer, Norway:
Men's HS 100:  Andreas Kofler  279.3 points  Richard Freitag  273.3  Kamil Stoch  249.6
Standings (after 2 of 27 events): (1) Kofler 200 points (2) Gregor Schlierenzauer  120 (3) Stoch 110
Women's HS 100:  Sarah Hendrickson  277.0 points  Coline Mattel  247.7  Melanie Faisst  245.5

Snooker
UK Championship in York, England, last 32:
Ding Junhui  6–5 Mark Davis 
John Higgins  6–5 Rory McLeod 
Graeme Dott  6–1 Matthew Selt 
Neil Robertson  6–1 Tom Ford 
Matthew Stevens  6–2 Marcus Campbell 
Stephen Maguire  6–3 Stephen Hendry

Speed skating
World Cup 3 in Heerenveen, Netherlands (NED unless stated):
Men's 500m:  Pekka Koskela  35.01  Joji Kato  35.02  Jesper Hospes 35.06
Standings (after 6 of 12 races): (1) Mo Tae-Bum  400 points (2) Kato 373 (3) Tucker Fredricks  348
Men's 10,000m:  Jorrit Bergsma 12:50.33  Bob de Jong 12:55.11  Bob de Vries 13:03.41
Standings (after 3 of 6 races): (1) Bergsma 280 points (2) Sven Kramer 210 (3) de Jong 190
Women's 500m:  Yu Jing  37.67  Jenny Wolf  38.19  Laurine van Riessen 38.20
Standings (after 6 of 12 races): (1) Lee Sang-Hwa  450 points (2) Wolf 420 (3) Yu 400
Women's 1500m:  Christine Nesbitt  1:55.68  Ireen Wüst 1:57.15  Yekaterina Shikhova  1:57.17
Standings (after 3 of 6 races): (1) Nesbitt 280 points (2) Wüst 250 (3) Shikhova 148

Tennis
Davis Cup Final, day 2:  2–1 
David Nalbandian/Eduardo Schwank  def. Feliciano López/Fernando Verdasco  6–4, 6–2, 6–3

Volleyball
FIVB Men's World Cup in Japan, Matchday 10 (teams in bold qualify for the 2012 Olympics):
 0–3 
 2–3 
 0–3 
 3–1 
 3–0 
 2–3 
Standings (after 10 matches): Russia 27 points, Poland 25, Brazil, Italy 21, Cuba 17, United States 16, Argentina 13, Iran, Serbia 12, Japan 8, China 5, Egypt 3.

December 2, 2011 (Friday)

Alpine skiing
Men's World Cup in Beaver Creek, United States:
Downhill:  Bode Miller  1:43.82  Beat Feuz  1:43.86  Klaus Kröll  1:43.96
Downhill standings (after 2 of 11 races): (1) Feuz 160 points (2) Didier Cuche  & Miller 129
Overall standings (after 4 of 45 races): (1) Cuche 209 points (2) Miller 187 (3) Aksel Lund Svindal  185
Women's World Cup in Lake Louise, Canada:
Downhill:  Lindsey Vonn  1:53.19  Tina Weirather  1:55.14  Dominique Gisin  1:55.25
Overall standings (after 4 of 40 races): (1) Viktoria Rebensburg  230 points (2) Vonn 222 (3) Elisabeth Görgl  151

American football
NCAA Football Bowl Subdivision Championship Games:
Pac-12 in Eugene, Oregon: Oregon 49, UCLA 31
The Ducks will play in the Rose Bowl.
MAC in Detroit, Michigan: Northern Illinois 23, Ohio 20.

Biathlon
World Cup 1 in Östersund, Sweden:
Men's 10 km Sprint:  Carl Johan Bergman  24:22.5 (0+0)  Tarjei Bø  24:30.1 (0+0)  Emil Hegle Svendsen  24:35.5 (0+1)
Overall standings (after 2 of 26 races): (1) Martin Fourcade  103 points (2) Michal Šlesingr  88 (3) Bergman 82

Bobsleigh
World Cup in Igls, Austria:
Two-woman:  Anja Schneiderheinze-Stöckel/Lisette Thöne  1:47.26 (53.69, 53.57)  Sandra Kiriasis/Petra Lammert  1:47.44 (53.82, 53.62)  Elana Meyers/Katie Eberling  1:47.82 (53.90, 53.92) & Christina Hengster/Inga Versen  1:47.82 (53.95, 53.87)

Cricket
New Zealand in Australia:
1st Test in Woolloongabba, Brisbane, day 2:  295 (82.5 overs);  154/3 (46 overs). Australia trail by 141 runs with 7 wickets remaining in the 1st innings.
West Indies in India:
2nd ODI in Visakhapatnam:  269/9 (50 overs);  270/5 (48.1 overs; Virat Kohli 117). India win by 5 wickets; lead 5-match series 2–0.

Football (soccer)
CAF U-23 Championship in Morocco (teams in bold advance to the semifinals):
Group A:
 4–1 
 0–1 
Final standings: Senegal, Morocco 6 points, Nigeria, Algeria 3.
OFC Champions League group stage Matchday 3:
Group A: Tefana  4–1  Ba
Standings:  Waitakere United 6 points (2 matches), Tefana 4 (3), Ba 3 (3),  Mont-Dore 1 (2).

Handball
World Women's Championship in Brazil:
Group C in São Paulo:  37–21

Skeleton
World Cup in Igls, Austria:
Women:  Olga Potylitsina  1:49.39 (54.71, 54.68)  Emma Lincoln-Smith  1:49.62 (54.66, 54.96)  Mellisa Hollingsworth  1:49.66 (54.76, 54.90)

Speed skating
World Cup 3 in Heerenveen, Netherlands:
500m Women:  Yu Jing  37.84  Lee Sang-Hwa  37.91  Wang Beixing  38.17
Standings (after 5 of 12 races): (1) Lee 390 points (2) Jenny Wolf  340 (3) Yu 300
500m Men:  Tucker Fredricks  34.98  Joji Kato  35.07  Mo Tae-Bum  35.08
Standings (after 5 of 12 races): (1) Mo 355 points (2) Kato 293 (3) Fredricks 288
5000m Women:  Martina Sáblíková  6:58.87  Claudia Pechstein  7:02.92  Stephanie Beckert  7:04.77
Standings (after 3 of 6 races): (1) Sáblíková 300 points (2) Pechstein 230 (3) Linda de Vries  156
1500m Men:  Ivan Skobrev  1:45.81  Kjeld Nuis  1:45.99  Håvard Bøkko  1:46.49
Standings (after 3 of 6 races): (1) Skobrev 202 points (2) Nuis 190 (3) Denny Morrison  & Shani Davis  180

Tennis
Davis Cup Final, day 1:  2–0 
Rafael Nadal  def. Juan Mónaco  6–1, 6–1, 6–2
David Ferrer  def. Juan Martín del Potro  6–2, 6–7(2), 3–6, 6–4, 6–3

Volleyball
FIVB Men's World Cup in Japan, Matchday 9:
 0–3 
 3–2 
 0–3 
 3–1 
 3–2 
 2–3 
Standings (after 9 matches): Russia, Poland 24 points, Brazil 19, Italy 18, Cuba 16, United States 14, Iran 12, Argentina 10, Serbia 9, Japan 8, China 5, Egypt 3.

December 1, 2011 (Thursday)

Baseball
Nippon Professional Baseball awards:
Most Valuable Players:
Central League: Takuya Asao, Chunichi Dragons
Pacific League: Seiichi Uchikawa, Fukuoka SoftBank Hawks

Basketball
Euroleague Regular Season Matchday 7 (team in bold qualify for Top 16):
Group A:
Fenerbahçe Ülker  86–70  Olympiacos
Bennet Cantù  71–68  Caja Laboral
Standings: Caja Laboral, Fenerbahçe Ülker, Bennet Cantù 4–3, Olympiacos,  Gescrap Bizkaia,  SLUC Nancy 3–4.
Group C:
EA7 Emporio Armani  65–72  Real Madrid
Partizan Mt:s Belgrade  74–71  Maccabi Tel Aviv
Standings: Maccabi Tel Aviv, Real Madrid 5–2,  Anadolu Efes, Partizan Mt:s Belgrade 4–3, EA7 Emporio Armani 2–5,  Spirou Charleroi 1–6.
Group D:
UNICS Kazan  72–61  Galatasaray Medical Park
Union Olimpija Ljubljana  57–63  Montepaschi Siena
Asseco Prokom Gdynia  45–76  FC Barcelona Regal
Standings: FC Barcelona Regal 7–0, Montepaschi Siena, UNICS Kazan 5–2, Galatasaray Medical Park 3–4, Union Olimpija Ljubljana 1–6, Asseco Prokom Gdynia 0–7.

Biathlon
World Cup 1 in Östersund, Sweden:
Women's 15 km Individual:  Darya Domracheva  47:15.6 (1+1+0+0)  Anna Maria Nilsson  48:24.1 (1+0+0+0)  Magdalena Neuner  48:57.3 (0+1+0+2)

Cricket
New Zealand in Australia:
1st Test in Woolloongabba, Brisbane, day 1:  176/5 (51 overs); .
Pakistan in Bangladesh:
1st ODI in Mirpur:  91 (30.3 overs; Shahid Afridi 5/23);  93/5 (25.4 overs). Pakistan win by 5 wickets; lead 3-match series 1–0.

Football (soccer)
UEFA Europa League group stage Matchday 5 (teams in bold qualify for Round of 32):
Group D:
Sporting CP  2–0  Zürich
Vaslui  0–0  Lazio
Standings (after 5 matches): Sporting CP 12 points, Vaslui, Lazio 6, Zürich 2.
Group E:
Stoke City  1–1  Dynamo Kyiv
Maccabi Tel Aviv  2–3  Beşiktaş
Standings (after 5 matches): Stoke City 11 points, Beşiktaş 9, Dynamo Kyiv 6, Maccabi Tel Aviv 1.
Group F:
Athletic Bilbao  2–1  Slovan Bratislava
Red Bull Salzburg  2–0  Paris Saint-Germain
Standings (after 5 matches): Athletic Bilbao 13 points, Red Bull Salzburg, Paris Saint-Germain 7, Slovan Bratislava 1.
Group J:
AEK Larnaca  2–1  Maccabi Haifa
Schalke 04  2–1  Steaua București
Standings (after 5 matches): Schalke 04 11 points, Maccabi Haifa 6, Steaua București, AEK Larnaca 5.
Group K:
Odense  1–2  Wisła Kraków
Twente  1–0  Fulham
Standings (after 5 matches): Twente 13 points, Fulham 7, Wisła Kraków 6, Odense 3.
Group L:
Lokomotiv Moscow  3–1  Sturm Graz
AEK Athens  1–2  Anderlecht
Standings (after 5 matches): Anderlecht 15 points, Lokomotiv Moscow 12, Sturm Graz 3, AEK Athens 0.

References

XII